= Pentagonal polytope =

Regular polytope whose 2D form is a pentagon

In geometry, a pentagonal polytope is a regular polytope in n dimensions constructed from the H_{n} Coxeter group. The family was named by H. S. M. Coxeter, because the two-dimensional pentagonal polytope is a pentagon. It can be named by its Schläfli symbol as {5, 3^{n − 2}} (dodecahedral) or {3^{n − 2}, 5} (icosahedral).

== Family members ==
The family starts as 1-polytopes and ends with n = 5 as infinite tessellations of 4-dimensional hyperbolic space.

There are two types of pentagonal polytopes; they may be termed the dodecahedral and icosahedral types, by their three-dimensional members. The two types are duals of each other.

=== Dodecahedral ===
The complete family of dodecahedral pentagonal polytopes are:

1. Line segment, { }
2. Pentagon, {5}
3. Dodecahedron, {5, 3} (12 pentagonal faces)
4. 120-cell, {5, 3, 3} (120 dodecahedral cells)
5. Order-3 120-cell honeycomb, {5, 3, 3, 3} (tessellates hyperbolic 4-space (∞ 120-cell facets)

The facets of each dodecahedral pentagonal polytope are the dodecahedral pentagonal polytopes of one less dimension. Their vertex figures are the simplices of one less dimension.

Dodecahedral pentagonal polytopes
n	Coxeter group	Petrie polygon projection	Name Coxeter diagram Schläfli symbol	Facets	Elements				
n	Coxeter group	Petrie polygon projection	Name Coxeter diagram Schläfli symbol	Facets	Vertices	Edges	Faces	Cells	4-faces
1	$H_1$ [ ] (order 2)		Line segment { }	2 vertices	2				
2	$H_2$ [5] (order 10)		Pentagon {5}	5 edges	5	5			
3	$H_3$ [5,3] (order 120)		Dodecahedron {5, 3}	12 pentagons	20	30	12		
4	$H_4$ [5,3,3] (order 14400)		120-cell {5, 3, 3}	120 dodecahedra	600	1200	720	120	
5	${\bar{H}}_4$ [5,3,3,3] (order ∞)		120-cell honeycomb {5, 3, 3, 3}	∞ 120-cells	∞	∞	∞	∞	∞

=== Icosahedral ===
The complete family of icosahedral pentagonal polytopes are:

1. Line segment, { }
2. Pentagon, {5}
3. Icosahedron, {3, 5} (20 triangular faces)
4. 600-cell, {3, 3, 5} (600 tetrahedron cells)
5. Order-5 5-cell honeycomb, {3, 3, 3, 5} (tessellates hyperbolic 4-space (∞ 5-cell facets)

The facets of each icosahedral pentagonal polytope are the simplices of one less dimension. Their vertex figures are icosahedral pentagonal polytopes of one less dimension.

Icosahedral pentagonal polytopes
n	Coxeter group	Petrie polygon projection	Name Coxeter diagram Schläfli symbol	Facets	Elements				
n	Coxeter group	Petrie polygon projection	Name Coxeter diagram Schläfli symbol	Facets	Vertices	Edges	Faces	Cells	4-faces
1	$H_1$ [ ] (order 2)		Line segment { }	2 vertices	2				
2	$H_2$ [5] (order 10)		Pentagon {5}	5 Edges	5	5			
3	$H_3$ [5,3] (order 120)		Icosahedron {3, 5}	20 equilateral triangles	12	30	20		
4	$H_4$ [5,3,3] (order 14400)		600-cell {3, 3, 5}	600 tetrahedra	120	720	1200	600	
5	${\bar{H}}_4$ [5,3,3,3] (order ∞)		Order-5 5-cell honeycomb {3, 3, 3, 5}	∞ 5-cells	∞	∞	∞	∞	∞

== Related star polytopes and honeycombs ==
The pentagonal polytopes can be stellated to form new star regular polytopes:

- In two dimensions, we obtain the pentagram {5/2},
- In three dimensions, this forms the four Kepler–Poinsot polyhedra, {3,5/2}, {5/2,3}, {5,5/2}, and {5/2,5}.
- In four dimensions, this forms the ten Schläfli–Hess polychora: {3,5,5/2}, {5/2,5,3}, {5,5/2,5}, {5,3,5/2}, {5/2,3,5}, {5/2,5,5/2}, {5,5/2,3}, {3,5/2,5}, {3,3,5/2}, and {5/2,3,3}.
- In four-dimensional hyperbolic space there are four regular star-honeycombs: {5/2,5,3,3}, {3,3,5,5/2}, {3,5,5/2,5}, and {5,5/2,5,3}.

In some cases, the star pentagonal polytopes are themselves counted among the pentagonal polytopes.

Like other polytopes, regular stars can be combined with their duals to form compounds;

- In two dimensions, a decagrammic star figure {10/2} is formed,
- In three dimensions, we obtain the compound of dodecahedron and icosahedron,
- In four dimensions, we obtain the compound of 120-cell and 600-cell.

Star polytopes can also be combined.

== Notes ==
Fundamental convex regular and uniform polytopes in dimensions 2–10
Family	A_{n}	B_{n}	I_{2}(p) / D_{n}	E_{6} / E_{7} / E_{8} / F_{4} / G_{2}	H_{n}
Regular polygon	Triangle	Square	p-gon	Hexagon	Pentagon
Uniform polyhedron	Tetrahedron	Octahedron • Cube	Demicube		Dodecahedron • Icosahedron
Uniform polychoron	Pentachoron	16-cell • Tesseract	Demitesseract	24-cell	120-cell • 600-cell
Uniform 5-polytope	5-simplex	5-orthoplex • 5-cube	5-demicube		
Uniform 6-polytope	6-simplex	6-orthoplex • 6-cube	6-demicube	1_{22} • 2_{21}	
Uniform 7-polytope	7-simplex	7-orthoplex • 7-cube	7-demicube	1_{32} • 2_{31} • 3_{21}	
Uniform 8-polytope	8-simplex	8-orthoplex • 8-cube	8-demicube	1_{42} • 2_{41} • 4_{21}	
Uniform 9-polytope	9-simplex	9-orthoplex • 9-cube	9-demicube		
Uniform 10-polytope	10-simplex	10-orthoplex • 10-cube	10-demicube		
Uniform n-polytope	n-simplex	n-orthoplex • n-cube	n-demicube	1_{k2} • 2_{k1} • k_{21}	n-pentagonal polytope
Topics: Polytope families • Regular polytope • List of regular polytopes and compounds • Polytope operations
