= Icosagon =

Polygon with 20 edges

Regular icosagon
- A regular icosagon
- Type: Regular polygon
- Edges and vertices: 20
- Schläfli symbol: {20}, t{10}, tt{5}
- Symmetry group: Dihedral (D_{20}), order 2×20
- Internal angle (degrees): 162°
- Properties: Convex, cyclic, equilateral, isogonal, isotoxal
- Dual polygon: Self

In geometry, an icosagon or 20-gon is a twenty-sided polygon. The sum of any icosagon's interior angles is 3,240°.

== Regular icosagon ==
The regular icosagon has Schläfli symbol {20}, and can also be constructed as a truncated decagon, t{10}, or a twice-truncated pentagon, tt{5}.

One interior angle in a regular icosagon is 162°, meaning that one exterior angle would be 18°.

The area of a regular icosagon with edge length t is $A={5}t^2(1+\sqrt{5}+\sqrt{5+2\sqrt{5}}) \simeq 31.5687 t^2.$

In terms of the radius R of its circumcircle, the area is $A=\frac{5R^2}{2}(\sqrt{5}-1);$ since the area of the circle is $\pi R^2,$ the regular icosagon fills approximately 98.36% of its circumcircle.

== Uses ==
The Big Wheel on the popular US game show The Price is Right has an icosagonal cross-section.

The Globe, the outdoor theater used by William Shakespeare's acting company, was discovered to have been built on an icosagonal foundation when a partial excavation was done in 1989.

As a golygonal path, the swastika is considered to be an irregular icosagon.

A regular square, pentagon, and icosagon can completely fill a plane vertex.

=== Construction ===
As 20 = 2^{2} × 5, regular icosagon is constructible using a compass and straightedge, or by an edge-bisection of a regular decagon, or a twice-bisected regular pentagon:

Construction of a regular icosagon	Construction of a regular decagon

== The golden ratio in an icosagon ==
- In the construction with given side length the circular arc around C with radius C̅D̅, shares the segment E̅_{2̅0̅}F̅ in ratio of the golden ratio.

$$\frac{\overline{ E_{20}E_1}}{\overline{E_1 F}} = \frac{\overline{E_{20} F}}{\overline{ E_{20}E_1}} = \frac{1+ \sqrt{5}}{2} =\varphi \approx 1.618$$

Icosagon with given side length, animation (The construction is very similar to that of decagon with given side length)

== Symmetry ==
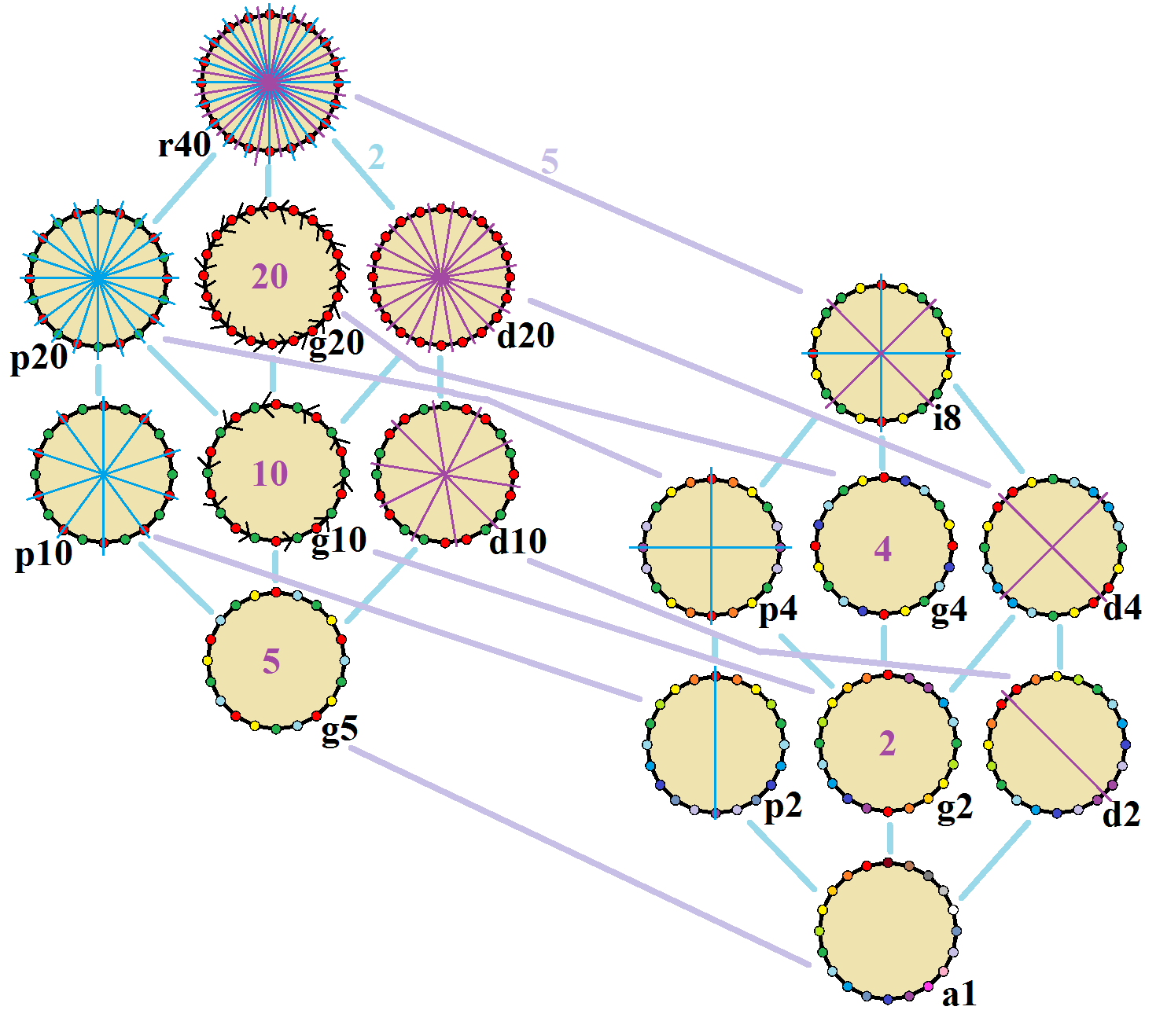
Symmetries of a regular icosagon. Vertices are colored by their symmetry positions. Blue mirrors are drawn through vertices, and purple mirrors are drawn through edge. Gyration orders are given in the center.

The regular icosagon has Dih_{20} symmetry, order 40. There are 5 subgroup dihedral symmetries: (Dih_{10}, Dih_{5}), and (Dih_{4}, Dih_{2}, and Dih_{1}), and 6 cyclic group symmetries: (Z_{20}, Z_{10}, Z_{5}), and (Z_{4}, Z_{2}, Z_{1}).

These 10 symmetries can be seen in 16 distinct symmetries on the icosagon, a larger number because the lines of reflections can either pass through vertices or edges. John Conway labels these by a letter and group order. Full symmetry of the regular form is r40 and no symmetry is labeled a1. The dihedral symmetries are divided depending on whether they pass through vertices (d for diagonal) or edges (p for perpendiculars), and i when reflection lines path through both edges and vertices. Cyclic symmetries in the middle column are labeled as g for their central gyration orders.

Each subgroup symmetry allows one or more degrees of freedom for irregular forms. Only the g20 subgroup has no degrees of freedom but can be seen as directed edges.

The highest symmetry irregular icosagons are d20, an isogonal icosagon constructed by ten mirrors which can alternate long and short edges, and p20, an isotoxal icosagon, constructed with equal edge lengths, but vertices alternating two different internal angles. These two forms are duals of each other and have half the symmetry order of the regular icosagon.

== Dissection ==
20-gon with 180 rhombs
regular	Isotoxal

Coxeter states that every zonogon (a 2m-gon whose opposite sides are parallel and of equal length) can be dissected into m(m − 1)/2 parallelograms. In particular this is true for regular polygons with evenly many sides, in which case the parallelograms are all rhombi. For the icosagon, m = 10, and it can be divided into 45: 5 squares and 4 sets of 10 rhombs. This decomposition is based on a Petrie polygon projection of a 10-cube, with 45 of 11520 faces. The list OEIS: A006245 enumerates the number of solutions as 18,410,581,880, including up to 20-fold rotations and chiral forms in reflection.

Dissection into 45 rhombs
10-cube

== Related polygons ==
An icosagram is a 20-sided star polygon, represented by symbol {20/n}. There are three regular forms given by Schläfli symbols: {20/3}, {20/7}, and {20/9}. There are also five regular star figures (compounds) using the same vertex arrangement: 2{10}, 4{5}, 5{4}, 2{10/3}, 4{5/2}, and 10{2}.

n	1	2	3	4	5
Form	Convex polygon	Compound	Star polygon	Compound	
Image	{20/1} = {20}	{20/2} = 2{10}	{20/3}	{20/4} = 4{5}	{20/5} = 5{4}
Interior angle	162°	144°	126°	108°	90°
n	6	7	8	9	10
Form	Compound	Star polygon	Compound	Star polygon	Compound
Image	{20/6} = 2{10/3}	{20/7}	{20/8} = 4{5/2}	{20/9}	{20/10} = 10{2}
Interior angle	72°	54°	36°	18°	0°

Deeper truncations of the regular decagon and decagram can produce isogonal (vertex-transitive) intermediate icosagram forms with equally spaced vertices and two edge lengths.

A regular icosagram, {20/9}, can be seen as a quasitruncated decagon, t{10/9} = {20/9}. Similarly a decagram, {10/3} has a quasitruncation t{10/7} = {20/7}, and finally a simple truncation of a decagram gives t{10/3} = {20/3}.

Icosagrams as truncations of a regular decagons and decagrams, {10}, {10/3}
Quasiregular	Quasiregular
t{10}={20}	t{10/9}={20/9}
t{10/3}={20/3}	t{10/7}={20/7}

== Petrie polygons ==
The regular icosagon is the Petrie polygon for a number of higher-dimensional polytopes, shown in orthogonal projections in Coxeter planes:

A_{19}	B_{10}		D_{11}	E_{8}	H_{4}	1/22H_{2}	2H_{2}	
19-simplex	10-orthoplex	10-cube	11-demicube	(4_{21})	600-cell	Grand antiprism	10-10 duopyramid	10-10 duoprism

It is also the Petrie polygon for the icosahedral 120-cell, small stellated 120-cell, great icosahedral 120-cell, and great grand 120-cell.
