= Great grand stellated 120-cell =

Regular Schläfli-Hess 4-polytope with 600 vertices

Great grand stellated 120-cell
Orthogonal projection
Type	Schläfli-Hess polychoron
Cells	120 {5/2,3}
Faces	720 {5/2}
Edges	1200
Vertices	600
Vertex figure	{3,3}
Schläfli symbol	{5/2,3,3}
Coxeter-Dynkin diagram	
Symmetry group	H_{4}, [3,3,5]
Dual	Grand 600-cell
Properties	Regular

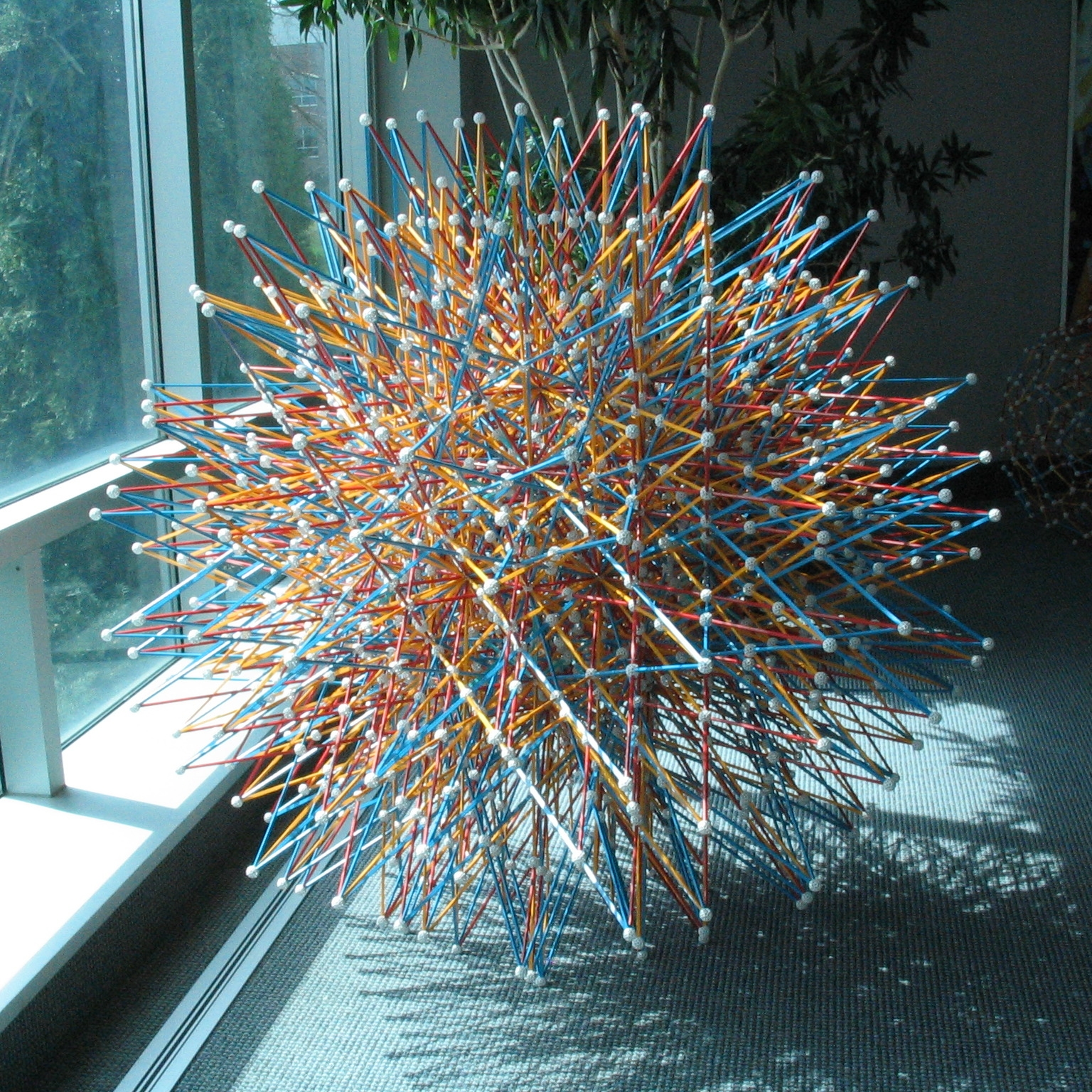
A Zome model

In geometry, the great grand stellated 120-cell or great grand stellated polydodecahedron is a regular star 4-polytope with Schläfli symbol {5/2,3,3}, one of 10 regular Schläfli-Hess 4-polytopes. It is unique among the 10 for having 600 vertices, and has the same vertex arrangement as the regular convex 120-cell.

It is one of four regular star polychora discovered by Ludwig Schläfli. It is named by John Horton Conway, extending the naming system by Arthur Cayley for the Kepler-Poinsot solids, and the only one containing all three modifiers in the name.

== Images ==
Coxeter plane images
H_{3}	A_{2} / B_{3}	A_{3} / B_{2}
Great grand stellated 120-cell, {5/2,3,3}
[10]	[6]	[4]
120-cell, {5,3,3}

== As a stellation ==
The great grand stellated 120-cell is the final regular stellation of the 120-cell, and is the only Schläfli-Hess polychoron to have the 120-cell for its convex hull. In this sense it is analogous to the three-dimensional great stellated dodecahedron, which is the final stellation of the dodecahedron and the only Kepler-Poinsot polyhedron to have the dodecahedron for its convex hull. Indeed, the great grand stellated 120-cell is dual to the grand 600-cell, which could be taken as a 4D analogue of the great icosahedron, dual of the great stellated dodecahedron.

The edges of the great grand stellated 120-cell are τ^{6} as long as those of the 120-cell core deep inside the polychoron, and they are τ^{3} as long as those of the small stellated 120-cell deep within the polychoron.

== See also ==
- List of regular polytopes
- Convex regular 4-polytope – Set of convex regular polychora
- Kepler-Poinsot solids – regular star polyhedron
- Star polygon – regular star polygons

Fundamental convex regular and uniform polytopes in dimensions 2–10
Family	A_{n}	B_{n}	I_{2}(p) / D_{n}	E_{6} / E_{7} / E_{8} / F_{4} / G_{2}	H_{n}
Regular polygon	Triangle	Square	p-gon	Hexagon	Pentagon
Uniform polyhedron	Tetrahedron	Octahedron • Cube	Demicube		Dodecahedron • Icosahedron
Uniform polychoron	Pentachoron	16-cell • Tesseract	Demitesseract	24-cell	120-cell • 600-cell
Uniform 5-polytope	5-simplex	5-orthoplex • 5-cube	5-demicube		
Uniform 6-polytope	6-simplex	6-orthoplex • 6-cube	6-demicube	1_{22} • 2_{21}	
Uniform 7-polytope	7-simplex	7-orthoplex • 7-cube	7-demicube	1_{32} • 2_{31} • 3_{21}	
Uniform 8-polytope	8-simplex	8-orthoplex • 8-cube	8-demicube	1_{42} • 2_{41} • 4_{21}	
Uniform 9-polytope	9-simplex	9-orthoplex • 9-cube	9-demicube		
Uniform 10-polytope	10-simplex	10-orthoplex • 10-cube	10-demicube		
Uniform n-polytope	n-simplex	n-orthoplex • n-cube	n-demicube	1_{k2} • 2_{k1} • k_{21}	n-pentagonal polytope
Topics: Polytope families • Regular polytope • List of regular polytopes and compounds • Polytope operations
