= 16-cell honeycomb honeycomb =

16-cell honeycomb honeycomb
(No image)
| Type | Hyperbolic regular honeycomb |
| Schläfli symbol | {3,3,4,3,3} |
| Coxeter diagram | |
| 5-faces | {3,3,4,3} |
| 4-faces | {3,3,4} |
| Cells | {3,3} |
| Faces | {3} |
| Cell figure | {3} |
| Face figure | {3,3} |
| Edge figure | {4,3,3} |
| Vertex figure | {3,4,3,3} |
| Dual | self-dual |
| Coxeter group | X̅_{5}, [3,3,4,3,3] |
| Properties | Regular |

In the geometry of hyperbolic 5-space, the 16-cell honeycomb honeycomb is one of five paracompact regular space-filling tessellations (or honeycombs). It is called paracompact because it has infinite vertex figures, with all vertices as ideal points at infinity. With Schläfli symbol {3,3,4,3,3}, it has three 16-cell honeycombs around each cell. It is self-dual.

== Related honeycombs ==
It is related to the regular Euclidean 4-space 16-cell honeycomb, {3,3,4,3}.

== See also ==
- List of regular polytopes
