= Grand 120-cell =

Grand 120-cell
Orthogonal projection
Type	Schläfli-Hess polytope
Cells	120 {5,3}
Faces	720 {5}
Edges	720
Vertices	120
Vertex figure	{3,5/2}
Schläfli symbol	{5,3,5/2}
Coxeter-Dynkin diagram	
Symmetry group	H_{4}, [3,3,5]
Dual	Great stellated 120-cell
Properties	Regular

In geometry, the grand 120-cell or grand polydodecahedron is a regular star 4-polytope with Schläfli symbol {5,3,5/2}. It is one of 10 regular Schläfli-Hess polytopes.

It is one of four regular star 4-polytopes discovered by Ludwig Schläfli. It is named by John Horton Conway, extending the naming system by Arthur Cayley for the Kepler-Poinsot solids.

== Related polytopes ==
It has the same edge arrangement as the 600-cell, icosahedral 120-cell and the same face arrangement as the great 120-cell.

Orthographic projections by Coxeter planes
H_{4}	-	F_{4}
[30]	[20]	[12]
H_{3}	A_{2} / B_{3} / D_{4}	A_{3} / B_{2}
[10]	[6]	[4]

It could be seen as another 4D analogue of the three-dimensional great dodecahedron due to being a pentagonal polytope with enlarged facets.

== See also ==
- List of regular polytopes
- Convex regular 4-polytope
- Kepler-Poinsot solids - regular star polyhedron
- Star polygon - regular star polygons
