= Grand 600-cell =

Regular star 4-polytope with 600 faces

Grand 600-cell
Orthogonal projection
Type	Regular star 4-polytope
Cells	600 {3,3}
Faces	1200 {3}
Edges	720
Vertices	120
Vertex figure	{3,5/2}
Schläfli symbol	{3,3,5/2}
Coxeter-Dynkin diagram	
Symmetry group	H_{4}, [3,3,5]
Dual	Great grand stellated 120-cell
Properties	Regular

In geometry, the grand 600-cell or grand polytetrahedron is a regular star 4-polytope with Schläfli symbol {3, 3, 5/2}. It is one of 10 regular Schläfli-Hess polytopes. It is the only one with 600 cells.

It is one of four regular star 4-polytopes discovered by Ludwig Schläfli. It was named by John Horton Conway, extending the naming system by Arthur Cayley for the Kepler-Poinsot solids.

The grand 600-cell can be seen as the four-dimensional analogue of the great icosahedron (which in turn is analogous to the pentagram); both of these are the only regular n-dimensional star polytopes which are derived by performing stellational operations on the pentagonal polytope which has simplectic faces. It can be constructed analogously to the pentagram, its two-dimensional analogue, via the extension of said (n-1)-D simplex faces of the core nD polytope (tetrahedra for the grand 600-cell, equilateral triangles for the great icosahedron, and line segments for the pentagram) until the figure regains regular faces.

The Grand 600-cell is also dual to the great grand stellated 120-cell, mirroring the great icosahedron's duality with the great stellated dodecahedron (which in turn is also analogous to the pentagram); all of these are the final stellations of the n-dimensional "dodecahedral-type" pentagonal polytope.

== Related polytopes ==
It has the same edge arrangement as the great stellated 120-cell, and grand stellated 120-cell, and same face arrangement as the great icosahedral 120-cell.

Orthographic projections by Coxeter planes
H_{3}	A_{2} / B_{3} / D_{4}	A_{3} / B_{2}

== See also ==
- List of regular polytopes
- Convex regular 4-polytope
- Kepler-Poinsot solids - regular star polyhedron
- Star polygon - regular star polygons
