= Great grand 120-cell =

Type of regular star 4-polytope

Great grand 120-cell
Orthogonal projection
Type	Schläfli-Hess polytope
Cells	120 {5,5/2}
Faces	720 {5}
Edges	1200
Vertices	120
Vertex figure	{5/2,3}
Schläfli symbol	{5,5/2,3}
Coxeter-Dynkin diagram	
Symmetry group	H_{4}, [3,3,5]
Dual	Great icosahedral 120-cell
Properties	Regular

In geometry, the great grand 120-cell or great grand polydodecahedron is a regular star 4-polytope with Schläfli symbol {5,5/2,3}. It is one of 10 regular Schläfli-Hess polytopes.

== Related polytopes ==
It has the same edge arrangement as the small stellated 120-cell.

Orthographic projections by Coxeter planes
H_{3}	A_{2} / B_{3} / D_{4}	A_{3} / B_{2}

== See also ==
- List of regular polytopes
- Convex regular 4-polytope
- Kepler-Poinsot polyhedron – regular star polyhedron
- Star polygon – regular star polygons
