= Great stellated 120-cell =

Regular star 4-polytope

Great stellated 120-cell
Orthogonal projection
Type	Schläfli-Hess polytope
Cells	120 {5/2,3}
Faces	720 {5/2}
Edges	720
Vertices	120
Vertex figure	{3,5}
Schläfli symbol	{5/2,3,5}
Coxeter-Dynkin diagram	
Symmetry group	H_{4}, [3,3,5]
Dual	Grand 120-cell
Properties	Regular

In geometry, the great stellated 120-cell or great stellated polydodecahedron is a regular star 4-polytope with Schläfli symbol {5/2,3,5}. It is one of 10 regular Schläfli-Hess polytopes.

It is one of four regular star 4-polytopes discovered by Ludwig Schläfli. It is named by John Horton Conway, extending the naming system by Arthur Cayley for the Kepler-Poinsot solids.

== Related polytopes ==
The great stellated 120-cell has the same edge arrangement as the great icosahedral 120-cell and grand 600-cell, and the same face arrangement as the grand stellated 120-cell.

Orthographic projections by Coxeter planes
H_{3}	A_{2} / B_{3} / D_{4}	A_{3} / B_{2}

== See also ==
- List of regular polytopes
- Convex regular 4-polytope
- Kepler-Poinsot solids - regular star polyhedron
- Star polygon - regular star polygons
