= Great icosahedral 120-cell =

Great icosahedral 120-cell
Orthogonal projection
Type	Schläfli-Hess polytope
Cells	120 {3,5/2}
Faces	1200 {3}
Edges	720
Vertices	120
Vertex figure	{5/2,5}
Schläfli symbol	{3,5/2,5}
Coxeter-Dynkin diagram	
Symmetry group	H_{4}, [3,3,5]
Dual	Great grand 120-cell
Properties	Regular

In geometry, the great icosahedral 120-cell, great polyicosahedron or great faceted 600-cell is a regular star 4-polytope with Schläfli symbol {3,5/2,5}. It is one of 10 regular Schläfli-Hess polytopes.

== Related polytopes ==
It has the same edge arrangement as the great stellated 120-cell, and grand stellated 120-cell, and face arrangement of the grand 600-cell.

Orthographic projections by Coxeter planes
H_{3}	A_{2} / B_{3} / D_{4}	A_{3} / B_{2}

== See also ==
- List of regular polytopes
- Convex regular 4-polytope
- Kepler-Poinsot solids - regular star polyhedron
- Star polygon - regular star polygons
