= Grand stellated 120-cell =

Grand stellated 120-cell
Orthogonal projection
Type	Schläfli-Hess polytope
Cells	120 {5/2,5}
Faces	720 {5/2}
Edges	720
Vertices	120
Vertex figure	{5,5/2}
Schläfli symbol	{5/2,5,5/2}
Coxeter-Dynkin diagram	
Symmetry group	H_{4}, [3,3,5]
Dual	self-dual
Properties	Regular

In geometry, the grand stellated 120-cell or grand stellated polydodecahedron is a regular star 4-polytope with Schläfli symbol {5/2,5,5/2}. It is one of 10 regular Schläfli-Hess polytopes. It is also one of two such polytopes that is self-dual.

== Related polytopes ==
The grand stellated 120-cell has the same edge arrangement as the great icosahedral 120-cell and grand 600-cell, and also the same face arrangement as the great stellated 120-cell.

Orthographic projections by Coxeter planes
H_{3}	A_{2} / B_{3} / D_{4}	A_{3} / B_{2}

Due to its self-duality, it does not have a good three-dimensional analogue, but (like all other star polyhedra and polychora) is analogous to the two-dimensional pentagram.

== See also ==
- List of regular polytopes
- Convex regular 4-polytope
- Kepler-Poinsot solids - regular star polyhedron
- Star polygon - regular star polygons
