= Small stellated 120-cell =

Complicated polygon

Small stellated 120-cell
Orthogonal projection
Type	Schläfli-Hess polytope
Cells	120 {5/2,5}
Faces	720 {5/2}
Edges	1200
Vertices	120
Vertex figure	{5,3}
Schläfli symbol	{5/2,5,3}
Coxeter-Dynkin diagram	
Symmetry group	H_{4}, [3,3,5]
Dual	Icosahedral 120-cell
Properties	Regular

In geometry, the small stellated 120-cell or stellated polydodecahedron is a regular star 4-polytope with Schläfli symbol {5/2,5,3}. It is one of 10 regular Schläfli-Hess polytopes.

== Related polytopes ==
It has the same edge arrangement as the great grand 120-cell, and also shares its 120 vertices with the 600-cell and eight other regular star 4-polytopes. It may also be seen as the first stellation of the 120-cell. In this sense it could be seen as analogous to the three-dimensional small stellated dodecahedron, which is the first stellation of the dodecahedron. Indeed, the small stellated 120-cell is dual to the icosahedral 120-cell, which could be taken as a 4D analogue of the great dodecahedron, dual of the small stellated dodecahedron.

The edges of the small stellated 120-cell are τ^{2} as long as those of the 120-cell core inside the 4-polytope.

Orthographic projections by Coxeter planes
H_{3}	A_{2} / B_{3} / D_{4}	A_{3} / B_{2}

== See also ==
- List of regular polytopes
- Convex regular 4-polytope - Set of convex regular 4-polytope
- Kepler-Poinsot solids - regular star polyhedron
- Star polygon - regular star polygons
