= Tesseract =

Four-dimensional analogue of the cube

Tesseract 8-cell (4-cube)
- Type: Convex regular 4-polytope
- Schläfli symbol: {4,3,3} t_{0,3}{4,3,2} or {4,3}×{ } t_{0,2}{4,2,4} or {4}×{4} t_{0,2,3}{4,2,2} or {4}×{ }×{ } t_{0,1,2,3}{2,2,2} or { }×{ }×{ }×{ }
- Cells: 8 {4,3}
- Faces: 24 {4}
- Edges: 32
- Vertices: 16
- Vertex figure: Tetrahedron
- Petrie polygon: octagon
- Coxeter group: B_{4}, [3,3,4]
- Dual: 16-cell
- Properties: convex, isogonal, isotoxal, isohedral, Hanner polytope
- Uniform index: 10

In geometry, a tesseract or 4-cube is a four-dimensional hypercube, analogous to a two-dimensional square and a three-dimensional cube. Just as the perimeter of the square consists of four edges and the surface of the cube consists of six square faces, the hypersurface of the tesseract consists of eight cubical cells, meeting at right angles. The tesseract is one of the six convex regular 4-polytopes.

The tesseract is also called an 8-cell, C_{8}, (regular) octachoron, or cubic prism. It is the four-dimensional measure polytope, taken as a unit for hypervolume. Harold Scott MacDonald Coxeter labels it the γ_{4} polytope. The term hypercube without a dimension reference is frequently treated as a synonym for this specific polytope.

== Construction ==
The construction of a tesseract can be visualized through the analogy of dimensions in the following steps:

1. One can take out two points that form a line segment with a certain length.
2. If another identical line segment is created in a perpendicular direction from itself, it sweeps out and forms a square (2-cube). The result has four points and four line segments, which are called vertices and edges, respectively.
3. Moving the square with the same length in the direction perpendicular to the plane it lies on generates a cube (3-cube). The result has eight vertices, twelve edges, and six squares. The squares are called the faces.
4. Moving the cube with the same length again in the fourth spatial axis generates a tesseract (4-cube).

A tesseract is bounded by eight cubes (its cells). Each cube shares each of its faces with another cube. Three cubes and three squares meet at each edge. Four cubes, six squares, and four edges meet at every vertex. Collectively, the tesseract consists of eight cubes, twenty-four squares, thirty-two edges, and sixteen vertices. The tesseract, like both the square and the cube, is a member of the hypercube's family.

An animation of the shifting in dimensions

The Dali cross is one of 261 tesseract nets, unfolded into eight cubes in three-dimensional space

An unfolding of a polytope is called a net. There are 261 distinct nets of the tesseract, each of which can tile 3-space. The unfoldings of the tesseract can be counted by mapping the nets to paired trees (a tree together with a perfect matching in its complement). One of these unfoldings is the Dali cross, named after Spanish surrealist artist Salvador Dalí, whose 1954 painting Corpus Hypercubus depicted it. It consists of eight cubes, four cubes stacked vertically and four more attached to the second-from-top of the first four.

== Etymology ==
The Oxford English Dictionary traces the word tesseract to Charles Howard Hinton's 1888 book A New Era of Thought. Hinton originally spelled the word as tessaract, changing it to tesseract in his 1904 book The Fourth Dimension. The term derives from the Ancient Greek téssara (τέσσαρα "four") and aktís (ἀκτίς 'ray'), referring to the four edges from each vertex to other vertices. The word "tesseract" has been adopted for numerous other uses in popular culture, including as a plot device in works of science fiction, often with little or no connection to the four-dimensional hypercube.

== Properties ==
The eight cells of a tesseract may be regarded in three different ways as two interlocked rings of four cubes. As a regular polytope with three cubes folded together around every edge, it has Schläfli symbol {4,3,3} with hyperoctahedral symmetry of order 384. Constructed as a 4D hyperprism made of two parallel cubes, it can be named as a composite Schläfli symbol {4,3} × { }, with symmetry order 96. As a 4-4 duoprism, a Cartesian product of two squares, it can be named by a composite Schläfli symbol {4}×{4}, with symmetry order 64. As an orthotope it can be represented by composite Schläfli symbol { } × { } × { } × { } or { }^{4}, with symmetry order 16.

Since each vertex of a tesseract is adjacent to four edges, the vertex figure of the tesseract is a regular tetrahedron. The dual polytope of the tesseract is the 16-cell with Schläfli symbol {3,3,4}. The tesseract, with 16 vertices, is the convex hull of a compound of two 16-cells, with 8 vertices each, in an exact dimensional analogy to the cube, with 8 vertices, which is the convex hull of a compound of two regular tetrahedra, with 4 vertices each.

Each edge of a regular tesseract is of the same length. This is of interest when using tesseracts as the basis for a network topology to link multiple processors in parallel computing: the distance between two nodes is at most 4, and there are many different paths to allow weight balancing.

The tesseract can be decomposed into smaller 4-polytopes. It is the convex hull of the compound of two demitesseracts (16-cells). It can also be triangulated into 4-dimensional simplices (irregular 5-cells) that share their vertices with the tesseract. It is known that there are 92487256 such triangulations and that the fewest 4-dimensional simplices in any of them is 16.

The dissection of the tesseract into instances of its characteristic simplex (a particular orthoscheme with Coxeter diagram) is the most basic direct construction of the tesseract possible. The characteristic 5-cell of the 4-cube is a fundamental region of the tesseract's defining symmetry group, the group which generates the B_{4} polytopes. The tesseract's characteristic simplex directly generates the tesseract through the actions of the group, by reflecting itself in its own bounding facets (its mirror walls).

=== Unit tesseract ===
A unit tesseract has side length 1, and is typically taken as the basic unit for hypervolume in 4-dimensional space. The unit tesseract in a Cartesian coordinate system for 4-dimensional space has two opposite vertices at coordinates [0, 0, 0, 0] and [1, 1, 1, 1], and other vertices with coordinates at all possible combinations of 0s and 1s. It is the Cartesian product of the closed unit interval [0, 1] in each axis.

Sometimes a unit tesseract is centered at the origin, so that its coordinates are the more symmetrical $\bigl({\pm\tfrac12}, \pm\tfrac12, \pm\tfrac12, \pm\tfrac12 \bigr).$ This is the Cartesian product of the closed interval $\bigl[{-\tfrac12}, \tfrac12\bigr]$ in each axis.

Another commonly convenient tesseract is the Cartesian product of the closed interval $[-1,1]$ in each axis, with vertices at coordinates $(\pm 1, \pm 1, \pm 1, \pm 1)$. This tesseract has side length 2 and hypervolume $2^4 = 16$.

=== Radial equilateral symmetry ===
The radius of a hypersphere circumscribed about a regular polytope is the distance from the polytope's center to one of the vertices, and for the tesseract this radius is equal to its edge length; the diameter of the sphere, the length of the diagonal between opposite vertices of the tesseract, is twice the edge length. Only a few uniform polytopes have this property, including the four-dimensional tesseract and 24-cell, the three-dimensional cuboctahedron, and the two-dimensional hexagon. In particular, the tesseract is the only hypercube (other than a zero-dimensional point) that is radially equilateral. The longest vertex-to-vertex diagonal of an $n$-dimensional hypercube of unit edge length is $\sqrt{n\vphantom{t}},$ which for the square is $\sqrt2,$ for the cube is $\sqrt3,$ and only for the tesseract is $\sqrt4 = 2$ edge lengths.

An axis-aligned tesseract inscribed in a unit-radius 3-sphere has vertices with coordinates $\bigl({\pm\tfrac12}, \pm\tfrac12, \pm\tfrac12, \pm\tfrac12\bigr).$

=== Formulas ===
Proof without words that a hypercube graph is non-planar using Kuratowski's or Wagner's theorems and finding either K_{5} (top) or K_{3,3} (bottom) subgraphs

For a tesseract with side length s:

- Hypervolume (4D): $H=s^4$
- Surface "volume" (3D): $SV=8s^3$
- Face diagonal: $d_\mathrm{2}=\sqrt{2} s$
- Cell diagonal: $d_\mathrm{3}=\sqrt{3} s$
- 4-space diagonal: $d_\mathrm{4}=2s$

=== As a configuration ===
The tesseract can be represented by configuration matrix
$$\begin{bmatrix}\begin{matrix}16 & 4 & 6 & 4 \\ 2 & 32 & 3 & 3 \\ 4 & 4 & 24 & 2 \\ 8 & 12 & 6 & 8 \end{matrix}\end{bmatrix}.$$
Here, the rows and columns correspond to vertices, edges, faces, and cells. The diagonal numbers say how many of each element occur in the whole tesseract, which reduces to the f-vector $(16,32,24,8)$. The nondiagonal numbers say how many of the column's element occur in or at the row's element. For example, the 2 in the first column of the second row indicates that there are two vertices in (i.e., at the extremes of) each edge; the 4 in the second column of the first row indicates that four edges meet at each vertex. The bottom row defines they facets, here cubes, have f-vector $(8,12,6)$. The next row left of diagonal is ridge elements (facet of cube), here a square, $(4,4)$. The upper row is the f-vector of the vertex figure, here tetrahedra, $(4,6,4)$. The next row is vertex figure ridge, here a triangle, $(3,3)$.

== Projections ==
It is possible to project tesseracts into three- and two-dimensional spaces, similarly to projecting a cube into two-dimensional space.

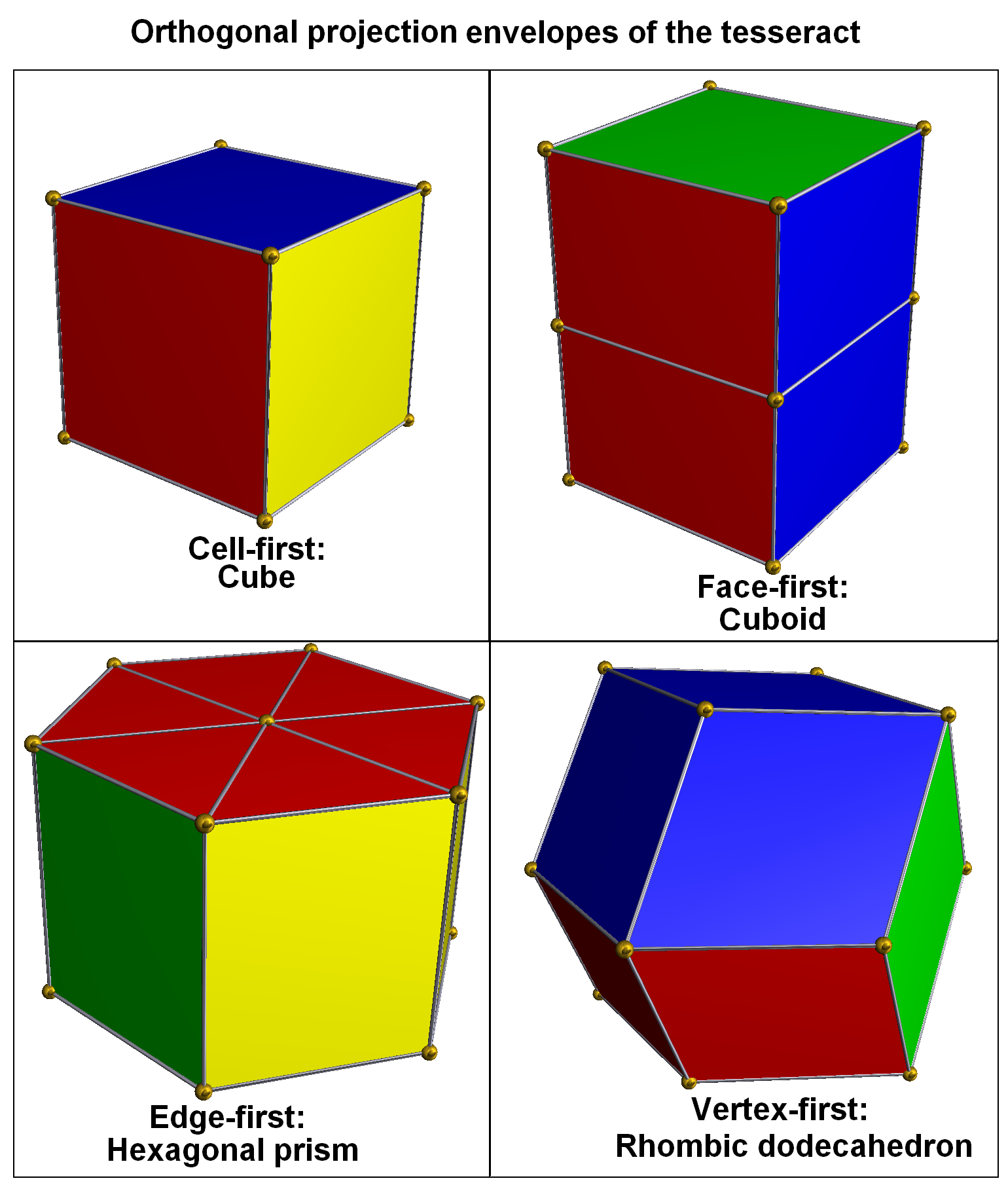
Parallel projection envelopes of the tesseract (each cell is drawn with different color faces, inverted cells are undrawn)

The rhombic dodecahedron forms the convex hull of the tesseract's vertex-first parallel-projection. The number of vertices in the layers of this projection is 1 4 6 4 1—the fourth row in Pascal's triangle.

The cell-first parallel projection of the tesseract into three-dimensional space has a cubical envelope. The nearest and farthest cells are projected onto the cube, and the remaining six cells are projected onto the six square faces of the cube.

The face-first parallel projection of the tesseract into three-dimensional space has a cuboidal envelope. Two pairs of cells project to the upper and lower halves of this envelope, and the four remaining cells project to the side faces.

The edge-first parallel projection of the tesseract into three-dimensional space has an envelope in the shape of a hexagonal prism. Six cells project onto rhombic prisms, which are laid out in the hexagonal prism in a way analogous to how the faces of the 3D cube project onto six rhombs in a hexagonal envelope under vertex-first projection. The two remaining cells project onto the prism bases.

The vertex-first parallel projection of the tesseract into three-dimensional space has a rhombic dodecahedral envelope. Two vertices of the tesseract are projected to the origin. There are exactly two ways of dissecting a rhombic dodecahedron into four congruent rhombohedra, giving a total of eight possible rhombohedra, each a projected cube of the tesseract. This projection is also the one with maximal volume. One set of projection vectors are u = (1,1,−1,−1), v = (−1,1,−1,1), w = (1,−1,−1,1).

Animation showing each individual cube within the B_{4} Coxeter plane projection of the tesseract

Orthographic projections
Coxeter plane	B_{4}	B_{4} --> A_{3}	A_{3}
Graph			
Dihedral symmetry	[8]	[4]	[4]
Coxeter plane	Other	B_{3} / D_{4} / A_{2}	B_{2} / D_{3}
Graph			
Dihedral symmetry	[2]	[6]	[4]

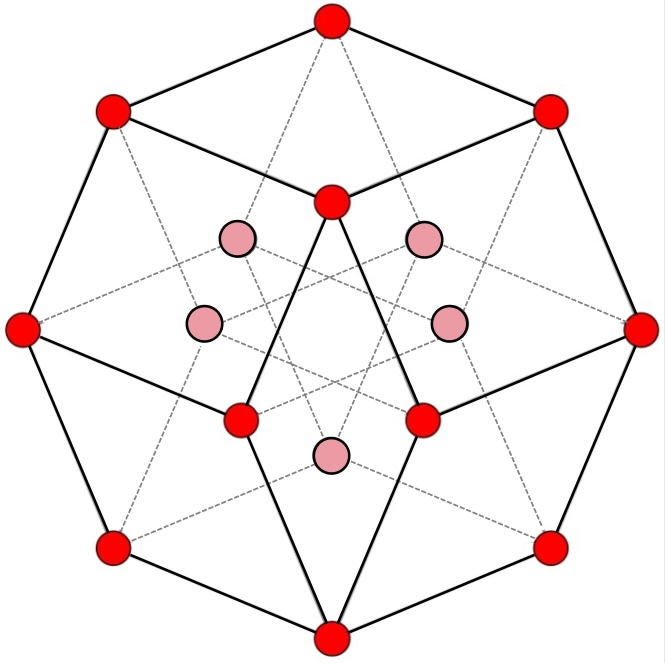
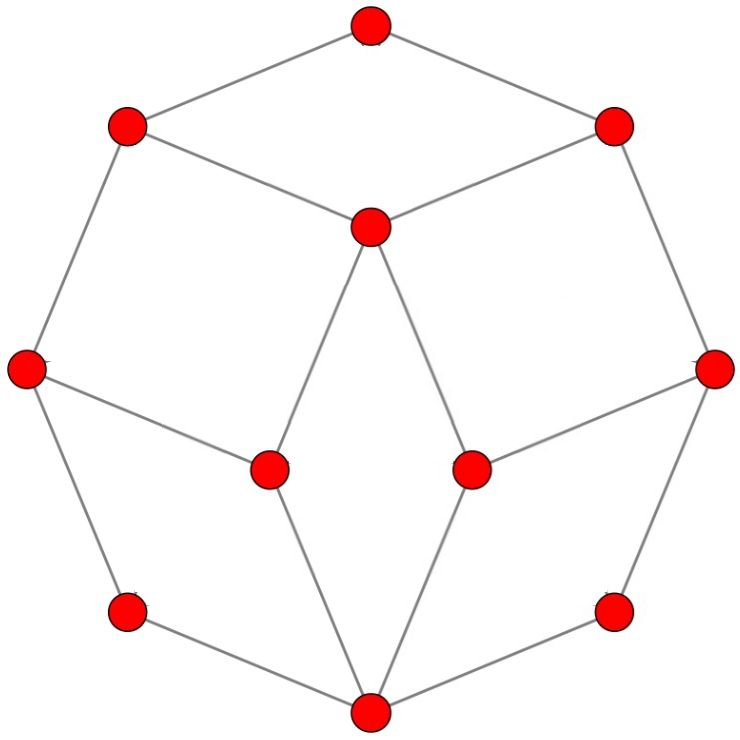
Orthographic projection Coxeter plane B_{4} graph with hidden lines as dash lines, and the tesseract without hidden lines.

A 3D projection of a tesseract performing a simple rotation about a plane in 4-dimensional space. The plane bisects the figure from front-left to back-right and top to bottom.	A 3D projection of a tesseract performing a double rotation about two orthogonal planes in 4-dimensional space.

3D Projection of three tesseracts with and without faces	Perspective with hidden volume elimination. The red corner is the nearest in 4D and has 4 cubical cells meeting around it.

The tetrahedron forms the convex hull of the tesseract's vertex-centered central projection. Four of 8 cubic cells are shown. The 16th vertex is projected to infinity and the four edges to it are not shown.	Stereographic projection (Edges are projected onto the 3-sphere)

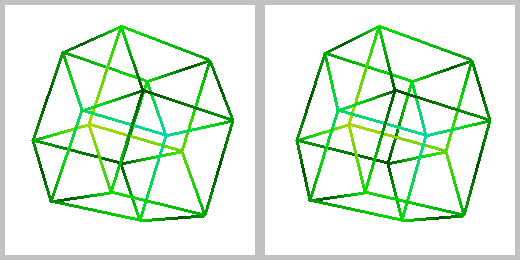
Stereoscopic 3D projection of a tesseract (parallel view)
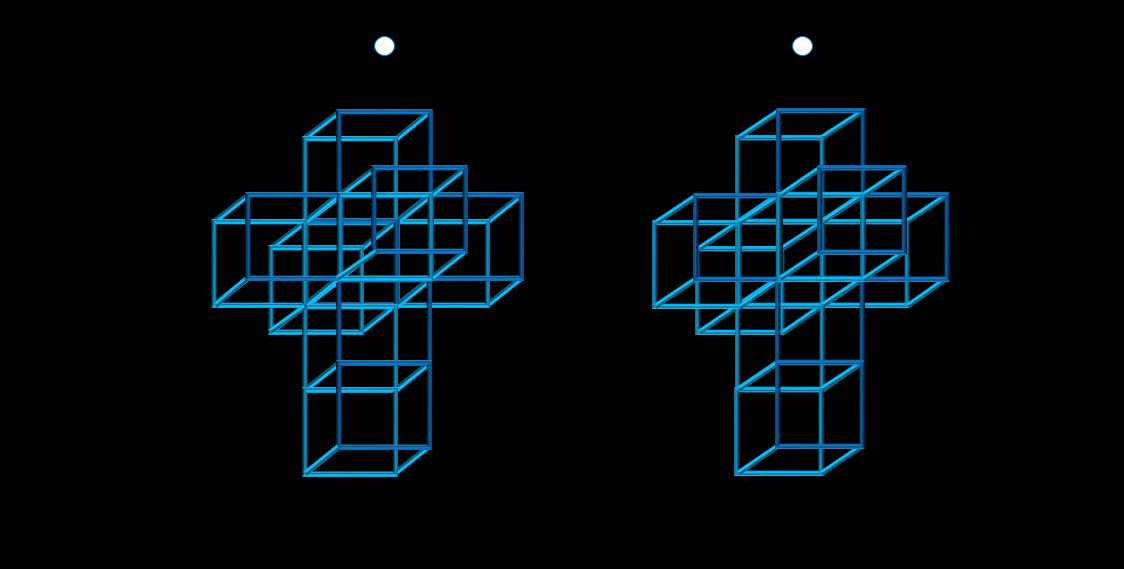
Stereoscopic 3D Disarmed Hypercube

== Tessellation ==
The tesseract, like all hypercubes, tessellates Euclidean space. The self-dual tesseractic honeycomb consisting of 4 tesseracts around each face has Schläfli symbol {4,3,3,4}. Hence, the tesseract has a dihedral angle of 90°.

The tesseract's radial equilateral symmetry makes its tessellation the unique regular body-centered cubic lattice of equal-sized spheres, in any number of dimensions.

== Related polytopes and honeycombs ==
The regular tesseract, along with the 16-cell, exists in a set of 15 uniform 4-polytopes with the same symmetry. The tesseract {4,3,3} exists in a sequence of regular 4-polytopes and honeycombs, {p,3,3} with tetrahedral vertex figures, {3,3}. The tesseract is also in a sequence of regular 4-polytope and honeycombs, {4,3,p} with cubic cells.

Orthogonal	Perspective
_{4}{4}_{2}, with 16 vertices and 8 4-edges, with the 8 4-edges shown here as 4 red and 4 blue squares

The regular complex polytope _{4}{4}_{2},, in $\mathbb{C}^2$ has a real representation as a tesseract or 4-4 duoprism in 4-dimensional space. _{4}{4}_{2} has 16 vertices, and 8 4-edges. Its symmetry is _{4}[4]_{2}, order 32. It also has a lower symmetry construction,, or _{4}{}×_{4}{}, with symmetry _{4}[2]_{4}, order 16. This is the symmetry if the red and blue 4-edges are considered distinct.

== In popular culture ==
La Grande Arche de la Défense, a three-dimensional projected tesseract-shaped building

In addition to Salvador Dali's 1954 Corpus Hypercubus, tesseracts have been a popular theme in other arts. Notable examples include:

- "And He Built a Crooked House", Robert Heinlein's 1940 science fiction story featuring a building in the form of an unfolded tesseract that folds up in an earthquake into its four-dimensional form. This and Martin Gardner's "The No-Sided Professor", published in 1946, are among the first in science fiction to introduce readers to the Möbius band, the Klein bottle, and the tesseract.
- The Grande Arche, a monument and building near Paris, France, completed in 1989. According to the monument's engineer, Erik Reitzel, the Grande Arche was designed to resemble the projection of a tesseract.
- Fez, a video game where one plays a character who can see beyond the two dimensions that other characters can see, and must use this ability to solve platforming puzzles. Features "Dot", a tesseract who helps the player navigate the world and tells how to use abilities, fitting the theme of seeing beyond human perception of known dimensional space.

Fundamental convex regular and uniform polytopes
Family	A_{n}	B_{n}	I_{2}(p) / D_{n}	E_{6} / E_{7} / E_{8} / F_{4} / G_{2}	H_{n}
Regular polygon	Triangle	Square	p-gon	Hexagon	Pentagon
Uniform polyhedron	Tetrahedron	Octahedron • Cube	Demicube		Dodecahedron • Icosahedron
Uniform polychoron	Pentachoron	16-cell • Tesseract	Demitesseract	24-cell	120-cell • 600-cell
Uniform 5-polytope	5-simplex	5-orthoplex • 5-cube	5-demicube		
Uniform 6-polytope	6-simplex	6-orthoplex • 6-cube	6-demicube	1_{22} • 2_{21}	
Uniform 7-polytope	7-simplex	7-orthoplex • 7-cube	7-demicube	1_{32} • 2_{31} • 3_{21}	
Uniform 8-polytope	8-simplex	8-orthoplex • 8-cube	8-demicube	1_{42} • 2_{41} • 4_{21}	
Uniform n-polytope	n-simplex	n-orthoplex • n-cube	n-demicube	1_{k2} • 2_{k1} • k_{21}	n-pentagonal polytope
Topics: Polytope families • Regular polytope • List of regular polytopes and compounds • Polytope operations
