= B5 polytope =

Orthographic projections in the B_{5} Coxeter plane
5-cube	5-orthoplex	5-demicube

In 5-dimensional geometry, there are 31 uniform polytopes with B_{5} symmetry. There are two regular forms, the 5-orthoplex, and 5-cube with 10 and 32 vertices respectively. The 5-demicube is added as an alternation of the 5-cube.

They can be visualized as symmetric orthographic projections in Coxeter planes of the B_{5} Coxeter group, and other subgroups.

== Graphs ==
Symmetric orthographic projections of these 32 polytopes can be made in the B_{5}, B_{4}, B_{3}, B_{2}, A_{3}, Coxeter planes. A_{k} has [k+1] symmetry, and B_{k} has [2k] symmetry.

These 32 polytopes are each shown in these 5 symmetry planes, with vertices and edges drawn, and vertices colored by the number of overlapping vertices in each projective position.

#	Graph B_{5} / A_{4} [10]	Graph B_{4} / D_{5} [8]	Graph B_{3} / A_{2} [6]	Graph B_{2} [4]	Graph A_{3} [4]	Coxeter-Dynkin diagram and Schläfli symbol Johnson and Bowers names
1						h{4,3,3,3} 5-demicube Hemipenteract (hin)
2						{4,3,3,3} 5-cube Penteract (pent)
3						t_{1}{4,3,3,3} = r{4,3,3,3} Rectified 5-cube Rectified penteract (rin)
4						t_{2}{4,3,3,3} = 2r{4,3,3,3} Birectified 5-cube Penteractitriacontaditeron (nit)
5						t_{1}{3,3,3,4} = r{3,3,3,4} Rectified 5-orthoplex Rectified triacontaditeron (rat)
6						{3,3,3,4} 5-orthoplex triacontaditeron (tac)
7						t_{0,1}{4,3,3,3} = t{3,3,3,4} Truncated 5-cube Truncated penteract (tan)
8						t_{1,2}{4,3,3,3} = 2t{4,3,3,3} Bitruncated 5-cube Bitruncated penteract (bittin)
9						t_{0,2}{4,3,3,3} = rr{4,3,3,3} Cantellated 5-cube Rhombated penteract (sirn)
10						t_{1,3}{4,3,3,3} = 2rr{4,3,3,3} Bicantellated 5-cube Small birhombi-penteractitriacontaditeron (sibrant)
11						t_{0,3}{4,3,3,3} Runcinated 5-cube Prismated penteract (span)
12						t_{0,4}{4,3,3,3} = 2r2r{4,3,3,3} Stericated 5-cube Small celli-penteractitriacontaditeron (scant)
13						t_{0,1}{3,3,3,4} = t{3,3,3,4} Truncated 5-orthoplex Truncated triacontaditeron (tot)
14						t_{1,2}{3,3,3,4} = 2t{3,3,3,4} Bitruncated 5-orthoplex Bitruncated triacontaditeron (bittit)
15						t_{0,2}{3,3,3,4} = rr{3,3,3,4} Cantellated 5-orthoplex Small rhombated triacontaditeron (sart)
16						t_{0,3}{3,3,3,4} Runcinated 5-orthoplex Small prismated triacontaditeron (spat)
17						t_{0,1,2}{4,3,3,3} = tr{4,3,3,3} Cantitruncated 5-cube Great rhombated penteract (girn)
18						t_{1,2,3}{4,3,3,3} = tr{4,3,3,3} Bicantitruncated 5-cube Great birhombi-penteractitriacontaditeron (gibrant)
19						t_{0,1,3}{4,3,3,3} Runcitruncated 5-cube Prismatotruncated penteract (pattin)
20						t_{0,2,3}{4,3,3,3} Runcicantellated 5-cube Prismatorhomated penteract (prin)
21						t_{0,1,4}{4,3,3,3} Steritruncated 5-cube Cellitruncated penteract (capt)
22						t_{0,2,4}{4,3,3,3} Stericantellated 5-cube Cellirhombi-penteractitriacontaditeron (carnit)
23						t_{0,1,2,3}{4,3,3,3} Runcicantitruncated 5-cube Great primated penteract (gippin)
24						t_{0,1,2,4}{4,3,3,3} Stericantitruncated 5-cube Celligreatorhombated penteract (cogrin)
25						t_{0,1,3,4}{4,3,3,3} Steriruncitruncated 5-cube Celliprismatotrunki-penteractitriacontaditeron (captint)
26						t_{0,1,2,3,4}{4,3,3,3} Omnitruncated 5-cube Great celli-penteractitriacontaditeron (gacnet)
27						t_{0,1,2}{3,3,3,4} = tr{3,3,3,4} Cantitruncated 5-orthoplex Great rhombated triacontaditeron (gart)
28						t_{0,1,3}{3,3,3,4} Runcitruncated 5-orthoplex Prismatotruncated triacontaditeron (pattit)
29						t_{0,2,3}{3,3,3,4} Runcicantellated 5-orthoplex Prismatorhombated triacontaditeron (pirt)
30						t_{0,1,4}{3,3,3,4} Steritruncated 5-orthoplex Cellitruncated triacontaditeron (cappin)
31						t_{0,1,2,3}{3,3,3,4} Runcicantitruncated 5-orthoplex Great prismatorhombated triacontaditeron (gippit)
32						t_{0,1,2,4}{3,3,3,4} Stericantitruncated 5-orthoplex Celligreatorhombated triacontaditeron (cogart)

Fundamental convex regular and uniform polytopes in dimensions 2–10
Family	A_{n}	B_{n}	I_{2}(p) / D_{n}	E_{6} / E_{7} / E_{8} / F_{4} / G_{2}	H_{n}
Regular polygon	Triangle	Square	p-gon	Hexagon	Pentagon
Uniform polyhedron	Tetrahedron	Octahedron • Cube	Demicube		Dodecahedron • Icosahedron
Uniform polychoron	Pentachoron	16-cell • Tesseract	Demitesseract	24-cell	120-cell • 600-cell
Uniform 5-polytope	5-simplex	5-orthoplex • 5-cube	5-demicube		
Uniform 6-polytope	6-simplex	6-orthoplex • 6-cube	6-demicube	1_{22} • 2_{21}	
Uniform 7-polytope	7-simplex	7-orthoplex • 7-cube	7-demicube	1_{32} • 2_{31} • 3_{21}	
Uniform 8-polytope	8-simplex	8-orthoplex • 8-cube	8-demicube	1_{42} • 2_{41} • 4_{21}	
Uniform 9-polytope	9-simplex	9-orthoplex • 9-cube	9-demicube		
Uniform 10-polytope	10-simplex	10-orthoplex • 10-cube	10-demicube		
Uniform n-polytope	n-simplex	n-orthoplex • n-cube	n-demicube	1_{k2} • 2_{k1} • k_{21}	n-pentagonal polytope
Topics: Polytope families • Regular polytope • List of regular polytopes and compounds • Polytope operations
