= Compound of 5-cube and 5-orthoplex =

Polytope

5-cube 5-orthoplex compound
Type	Compound
Schläfli symbol	{4,3,3,3} ∪ {3,3,3,4}
Coxeter diagram	∪
Intersection	Birectified 5-cube
Convex hull	dual of rectified 5-orthoplex
5-polytopes	2: 1 5-cube 1 5-orthoplex
Polychora	42: 10 tesseract 32 16-cell
Polyhedra	120: 40 cubes 80 tetrahedra
Faces	160: 80 squares 80 triangles
Edges	120 (80+40)
Vertices	42 (32+10)
Symmetry group	B_{5}, [4,3,3,3], order 3840

In 5-dimensional geometry, the 5-cube 5-orthoplex compound is a polytope compound composed of a regular 5-cube and dual regular 5-orthoplex. A compound polytope is a figure that is composed of several polytopes sharing a common center. The outer vertices of a compound can be connected to form a convex polytope called the convex hull. The compound is a facetting of the convex hull.

In 5-polytope compounds constructed as dual pairs, the hypercells and vertices swap positions and cells and edges swap positions. Because of this the number of hypercells and vertices are equal, as are cells and edges. Mid-edges of the 5-cube cross mid-cell in the 16-cell, and vice versa.

It can be seen as the 5-dimensional analogue of a compound of cube and octahedron.

== Construction ==
The 42 Cartesian coordinates of the vertices of the compound are.

10: (±2, 0, 0, 0, 0), (0, ±2, 0, 0, 0), (0, 0, ±2, 0, 0), (0, 0, 0, ±2, 0), (0, 0, 0, 0, ±2)
32: (±1, ±1, ±1, ±1, ±1)

The convex hull of the vertices makes the dual of rectified 5-orthoplex.

The intersection of the 5-cube and 5-orthoplex compound is the uniform birectified 5-cube: = ∩.

== Images ==
The compound can be seen in projection as the union of the two polytope graphs. The convex hull as the dual of the rectified 5-orthoplex will have the same vertices, but different edges.

Polytopes in B5 Coxeter plane
5-cube	5-orthoplex	Compound	Birectified 5-orthoplex (Intersection)
		∪	
