= Stericated 5-cubes =

5-cube	Stericated 5-cube	Steritruncated 5-cube
Stericantellated 5-cube	Steritruncated 5-orthoplex	Stericantitruncated 5-cube
Steriruncitruncated 5-cube	Stericantitruncated 5-orthoplex	Omnitruncated 5-cube
Orthogonal projections in B_{5} Coxeter plane

In five-dimensional geometry, a stericated 5-cube is a convex uniform 5-polytope with fourth-order truncations (sterication) of the regular 5-cube.

There are eight degrees of sterication for the 5-cube, including permutations of runcination, cantellation, and truncation. The simple stericated 5-cube is also called an expanded 5-cube, with the first and last nodes ringed, for being constructible by an expansion operation applied to the regular 5-cube. The highest form, the steriruncicantitruncated 5-cube, is more simply called an omnitruncated 5-cube with all of the nodes ringed.

== Stericated 5-cube ==
Stericated 5-cube
Type	Uniform 5-polytope
Schläfli symbol	2r2r{4,3,3,3}
Coxeter-Dynkin diagram	
4-faces	242
Cells	800
Faces	1040
Edges	640
Vertices	160
Vertex figure	
Coxeter group	B_{5} [4,3,3,3]
Properties	convex

=== Alternate names ===
- Stericated penteract / Stericated 5-orthoplex / Stericated pentacross
- Expanded penteract / Expanded 5-orthoplex / Expanded pentacross
- Small cellated penteractitriacontaditeron (scant) (Jonathan Bowers)

=== Coordinates ===
The Cartesian coordinates of the vertices of a stericated 5-cube having edge length 2 are all permutations of:

$$\left(\pm1,\ \pm1,\ \pm1,\ \pm1,\ \pm(1+\sqrt{2})\right)$$

=== Images ===
The stericated 5-cube is constructed by a sterication operation applied to the 5-cube.

=== Dissections ===
The stericated 5-cube can be dissected into two tesseractic cupolae and a runcinated tesseract between them. This dissection can be seen as analogous to the 4D runcinated tesseract being dissected into two cubic cupolae and a central rhombicuboctahedral prism between them, and also the 3D rhombicuboctahedron being dissected into two square cupolae with a central octagonal prism between them.

Orthographic projections
Coxeter plane	B_{5}	B_{4} / D_{5}	B_{3} / D_{4} / A_{2}
Graph			
Dihedral symmetry	[10]	[8]	[6]
Coxeter plane	B_{2}	A_{3}	
Graph			
Dihedral symmetry	[4]	[4]	

== Steritruncated 5-cube ==
Steritruncated 5-cube
Type	uniform 5-polytope
Schläfli symbol	t_{0,1,4}{4,3,3,3}
Coxeter-Dynkin diagrams	
4-faces	242
Cells	1600
Faces	2960
Edges	2240
Vertices	640
Vertex figure	
Coxeter groups	B_{5}, [3,3,3,4]
Properties	convex

=== Alternate names ===
- Steritruncated penteract
- Celliprismated triacontaditeron (capt) (Jonathan Bowers)

=== Construction and coordinates ===
The Cartesian coordinates of the vertices of a steritruncated 5-cube having edge length 2 are all permutations of:

$$\left(\pm1,\ \pm(1+\sqrt{2}),\ \pm(1+\sqrt{2}),\ \pm(1+\sqrt{2}),\ \pm(1+2\sqrt{2})\right)$$

=== Images ===
Orthographic projections
Coxeter plane	B_{5}	B_{4} / D_{5}	B_{3} / D_{4} / A_{2}
Graph			
Dihedral symmetry	[10]	[8]	[6]
Coxeter plane	B_{2}	A_{3}	
Graph			
Dihedral symmetry	[4]	[4]	

== Stericantellated 5-cube ==
Stericantellated 5-cube
Type	Uniform 5-polytope
Schläfli symbol	t_{0,2,4}{4,3,3,3}
Coxeter-Dynkin diagram	
4-faces	242
Cells	2080
Faces	4720
Edges	3840
Vertices	960
Vertex figure	
Coxeter group	B_{5} [4,3,3,3]
Properties	convex

=== Alternate names ===
- Stericantellated penteract
- Stericantellated 5-orthoplex, stericantellated pentacross
- Cellirhombated penteractitriacontaditeron (carnit) (Jonathan Bowers)

=== Coordinates ===
The Cartesian coordinates of the vertices of a stericantellated 5-cube having edge length 2 are all permutations of:

$$\left(\pm1,\ \pm1,\ \pm1,\ \pm(1+\sqrt{2}),\ \pm(1+2\sqrt{2})\right)$$

=== Images ===
Orthographic projections
Coxeter plane	B_{5}	B_{4} / D_{5}	B_{3} / D_{4} / A_{2}
Graph			
Dihedral symmetry	[10]	[8]	[6]
Coxeter plane	B_{2}	A_{3}	
Graph			
Dihedral symmetry	[4]	[4]	

== Stericantitruncated 5-cube ==
Stericantitruncated 5-cube
Type	Uniform 5-polytope
Schläfli symbol	t_{0,1,2,4}{4,3,3,3}
Coxeter-Dynkin diagram	
4-faces	242
Cells	2400
Faces	6000
Edges	5760
Vertices	1920
Vertex figure	
Coxeter group	B_{5} [4,3,3,3]
Properties	convex, isogonal

=== Alternate names ===
- Stericantitruncated penteract
- Steriruncicantellated triacontaditeron / Biruncicantitruncated pentacross
- Celligreatorhombated penteract (cogrin) (Jonathan Bowers)

=== Coordinates ===
The Cartesian coordinates of the vertices of a stericantitruncated 5-cube having an edge length of 2 are given by all permutations of coordinates and sign of:

$$\left(1,\ 1+\sqrt{2},\ 1+2\sqrt{2},\ 1+2\sqrt{2},\ 1+3\sqrt{2}\right)$$

=== Images ===
Orthographic projections
Coxeter plane	B_{5}	B_{4} / D_{5}	B_{3} / D_{4} / A_{2}
Graph			
Dihedral symmetry	[10]	[8]	[6]
Coxeter plane	B_{2}	A_{3}	
Graph			
Dihedral symmetry	[4]	[4]	

== Steriruncitruncated 5-cube ==
Steriruncitruncated 5-cube
Type	Uniform 5-polytope
Schläfli symbol	2t2r{4,3,3,3}
Coxeter-Dynkin diagram	
4-faces	242
Cells	2160
Faces	5760
Edges	5760
Vertices	1920
Vertex figure	
Coxeter group	B_{5} [4,3,3,3]
Properties	convex, isogonal

=== Alternate names ===
- Steriruncitruncated penteract / Steriruncitruncated 5-orthoplex / Steriruncitruncated pentacross
- Celliprismatotruncated penteractitriacontaditeron (captint) (Jonathan Bowers)

=== Coordinates ===
The Cartesian coordinates of the vertices of a steriruncitruncated penteract having an edge length of 2 are given by all permutations of coordinates and sign of:

$$\left(1,\ 1+\sqrt{2},\ 1+1\sqrt{2},\ 1+2\sqrt{2},\ 1+3\sqrt{2}\right)$$

=== Images ===
Orthographic projections
Coxeter plane	B_{5}	B_{4} / D_{5}	B_{3} / D_{4} / A_{2}
Graph			
Dihedral symmetry	[10]	[8]	[6]
Coxeter plane	B_{2}	A_{3}	
Graph			
Dihedral symmetry	[4]	[4]	

== Steritruncated 5-orthoplex ==
Steritruncated 5-orthoplex
Type	uniform 5-polytope
Schläfli symbol	t_{0,1,4}{3,3,3,4}
Coxeter-Dynkin diagrams	
4-faces	242
Cells	1520
Faces	2880
Edges	2240
Vertices	640
Vertex figure	
Coxeter group	B_{5}, [3,3,3,4]
Properties	convex

=== Alternate names ===
- Steritruncated pentacross
- Celliprismated penteract (cappin) (Jonathan Bowers)

=== Coordinates ===
Cartesian coordinates for the vertices of a steritruncated 5-orthoplex, centered at the origin, are all permutations of

$$\left(\pm1,\ \pm1,\ \pm1,\ \pm1,\ \pm(1+\sqrt{2})\right)$$

=== Images ===
Orthographic projections
Coxeter plane	B_{5}	B_{4} / D_{5}	B_{3} / D_{4} / A_{2}
Graph			
Dihedral symmetry	[10]	[8]	[6]
Coxeter plane	B_{2}	A_{3}	
Graph			
Dihedral symmetry	[4]	[4]	

== Stericantitruncated 5-orthoplex ==
Stericantitruncated 5-orthoplex
Type	Uniform 5-polytope
Schläfli symbol	t_{0,2,3,4}{4,3,3,3}
Coxeter-Dynkin diagram	
4-faces	242
Cells	2320
Faces	5920
Edges	5760
Vertices	1920
Vertex figure	
Coxeter group	B_{5} [4,3,3,3]
Properties	convex, isogonal

=== Alternate names ===
- Stericantitruncated pentacross
- Celligreatorhombated triacontaditeron (cogart) (Jonathan Bowers)

=== Coordinates ===
The Cartesian coordinates of the vertices of a stericantitruncated 5-orthoplex having an edge length of 2 are given by all permutations of coordinates and sign of:

$$\left(1,\ 1,\ 1+\sqrt{2},\ 1+2\sqrt{2},\ 1+3\sqrt{2}\right)$$

=== Images ===
Orthographic projections
Coxeter plane	B_{5}	B_{4} / D_{5}	B_{3} / D_{4} / A_{2}
Graph			
Dihedral symmetry	[10]	[8]	[6]
Coxeter plane	B_{2}	A_{3}	
Graph			
Dihedral symmetry	[4]	[4]	

== Omnitruncated 5-cube ==
Omnitruncated 5-cube
Type	Uniform 5-polytope
Schläfli symbol	tr2r{4,3,3,3}
Coxeter-Dynkin diagram	
4-faces	242
Cells	2640
Faces	8160
Edges	9600
Vertices	3840
Vertex figure	irr. {3,3,3}
Coxeter group	B_{5} [4,3,3,3]
Properties	convex, isogonal

=== Alternate names ===
- Steriruncicantitruncated 5-cube (Full expansion of omnitruncation for 5-polytopes by Johnson)
- Omnitruncated penteract
- Omnitruncated triacontaditeron / Omnitruncated pentacross
- Great cellated penteractitriacontaditeron (gacnet) (Jonathan Bowers)

=== Coordinates ===
The Cartesian coordinates of the vertices of an omnitruncated 5-cube having an edge length of 2 are given by all permutations of coordinates and sign of:

$$\left(1,\ 1+\sqrt{2},\ 1+2\sqrt{2},\ 1+3\sqrt{2},\ 1+4\sqrt{2}\right)$$

=== Images ===
Orthographic projections
Coxeter plane	B_{5}	B_{4} / D_{5}	B_{3} / D_{4} / A_{2}
Graph			
Dihedral symmetry	[10]	[8]	[6]
Coxeter plane	B_{2}	A_{3}	
Graph			
Dihedral symmetry	[4]	[4]	

=== Full snub 5-cube ===
The full snub 5-cube or omnisnub 5-cube, defined as an alternation of the omnitruncated 5-cube is not uniform, but it can be given Coxeter diagram and symmetry [4,3,3,3]^{+}, and constructed from 10 snub tesseracts, 32 snub 5-cells, 40 snub cubic antiprisms, 80 snub tetrahedral antiprisms, 80 3-4 duoantiprisms, and 1920 irregular 5-cells filling the gaps at the deleted vertices.

== Related polytopes ==
The presented eight polytopes are from the family of 31 uniform 5-polytopes generated from the regular 5-cube or 5-orthoplex.

B5 polytopes
β_{5}	t_{1}β_{5}	t_{2}γ_{5}	t_{1}γ_{5}	γ_{5}	t_{0,1}β_{5}	t_{0,2}β_{5}	t_{1,2}β_{5}
t_{0,3}β_{5}	t_{1,3}γ_{5}	t_{1,2}γ_{5}	t_{0,4}γ_{5}	t_{0,3}γ_{5}	t_{0,2}γ_{5}	t_{0,1}γ_{5}	t_{0,1,2}β_{5}
t_{0,1,3}β_{5}	t_{0,2,3}β_{5}	t_{1,2,3}γ_{5}	t_{0,1,4}β_{5}	t_{0,2,4}γ_{5}	t_{0,2,3}γ_{5}	t_{0,1,4}γ_{5}	t_{0,1,3}γ_{5}
t_{0,1,2}γ_{5}	t_{0,1,2,3}β_{5}	t_{0,1,2,4}β_{5}	t_{0,1,3,4}γ_{5}	t_{0,1,2,4}γ_{5}	t_{0,1,2,3}γ_{5}	t_{0,1,2,3,4}γ_{5}	

== Notes ==
Fundamental convex regular and uniform polytopes in dimensions 2–10
Family	A_{n}	B_{n}	I_{2}(p) / D_{n}	E_{6} / E_{7} / E_{8} / F_{4} / G_{2}	H_{n}
Regular polygon	Triangle	Square	p-gon	Hexagon	Pentagon
Uniform polyhedron	Tetrahedron	Octahedron • Cube	Demicube		Dodecahedron • Icosahedron
Uniform polychoron	Pentachoron	16-cell • Tesseract	Demitesseract	24-cell	120-cell • 600-cell
Uniform 5-polytope	5-simplex	5-orthoplex • 5-cube	5-demicube		
Uniform 6-polytope	6-simplex	6-orthoplex • 6-cube	6-demicube	1_{22} • 2_{21}	
Uniform 7-polytope	7-simplex	7-orthoplex • 7-cube	7-demicube	1_{32} • 2_{31} • 3_{21}	
Uniform 8-polytope	8-simplex	8-orthoplex • 8-cube	8-demicube	1_{42} • 2_{41} • 4_{21}	
Uniform 9-polytope	9-simplex	9-orthoplex • 9-cube	9-demicube		
Uniform 10-polytope	10-simplex	10-orthoplex • 10-cube	10-demicube		
Uniform n-polytope	n-simplex	n-orthoplex • n-cube	n-demicube	1_{k2} • 2_{k1} • k_{21}	n-pentagonal polytope
Topics: Polytope families • Regular polytope • List of regular polytopes and compounds • Polytope operations
