= Runcinated 5-orthoplexes =

5-orthoplex	Runcinated 5-orthoplex	Runcinated 5-cube
Runcitruncated 5-orthoplex	Runcicantellated 5-orthoplex	Runcicantitruncated 5-orthoplex
Runcitruncated 5-cube	Runcicantellated 5-cube	Runcicantitruncated 5-cube
Orthogonal projections in B_{5} Coxeter plane

In five-dimensional geometry, a runcinated 5-orthoplex is a convex uniform 5-polytope with 3rd order truncation (runcination) of the regular 5-orthoplex.

There are 8 runcinations of the 5-orthoplex with permutations of truncations, and cantellations. Four are more simply constructed relative to the 5-cube.

== Runcinated 5-orthoplex ==
Runcinated 5-orthoplex
Type	Uniform 5-polytope
Schläfli symbol	t_{0,3}{3,3,3,4}
Coxeter-Dynkin diagram	
4-faces	162
Cells	1200
Faces	2160
Edges	1440
Vertices	320
Vertex figure	
Coxeter group	B_{5} [4,3,3,3] D_{5} [3^{2,1,1}]
Properties	convex

=== Alternate names ===
- Runcinated pentacross
- Small prismated triacontaditeron (Acronym: spat) (Jonathan Bowers)

=== Coordinates ===
The vertices of the can be made in 5-space, as permutations and sign combinations of:

(0,1,1,1,2)

=== Images ===
Orthographic projections
Coxeter plane	B_{5}	B_{4} / D_{5}	B_{3} / D_{4} / A_{2}
Graph			
Dihedral symmetry	[10]	[8]	[6]
Coxeter plane	B_{2}	A_{3}	
Graph			
Dihedral symmetry	[4]	[4]	

== Runcitruncated 5-orthoplex ==
Runcitruncated 5-orthoplex
Type	uniform 5-polytope
Schläfli symbol	t_{0,1,3}{3,3,3,4} t_{0,1,3}{3,3^{1,1}}
Coxeter-Dynkin diagrams	
4-faces	162
Cells	1440
Faces	3680
Edges	3360
Vertices	960
Vertex figure	
Coxeter groups	B_{5}, [3,3,3,4] D_{5}, [3^{2,1,1}]
Properties	convex

=== Alternate names ===
- Runcitruncated pentacross
- Prismatotruncated triacontaditeron (Acronym: pattit) (Jonathan Bowers)

=== Coordinates ===
Cartesian coordinates for the vertices of a runcitruncated 5-orthoplex, centered at the origin, are all 80 vertices are sign (4) and coordinate (20) permutations of

(±3,±2,±1,±1,0)

=== Images ===
Orthographic projections
Coxeter plane	B_{5}	B_{4} / D_{5}	B_{3} / D_{4} / A_{2}
Graph			
Dihedral symmetry	[10]	[8]	[6]
Coxeter plane	B_{2}	A_{3}	
Graph			
Dihedral symmetry	[4]	[4]	

== Runcicantellated 5-orthoplex ==
Runcicantellated 5-orthoplex
Type	Uniform 5-polytope
Schläfli symbol	t_{0,2,3}{3,3,3,4} t_{0,2,3}{3,3,3^{1,1}}
Coxeter-Dynkin diagram	
4-faces	162
Cells	1200
Faces	2960
Edges	2880
Vertices	960
Vertex figure	
Coxeter group	B_{5} [4,3,3,3] D_{5} [3^{2,1,1}]
Properties	convex

=== Alternate names ===
- Runcicantellated pentacross
- Prismatorhombated triacontaditeron (Acronym: pirt) (Jonathan Bowers)

=== Coordinates ===
The vertices of the runcicantellated 5-orthoplex can be made in 5-space, as permutations and sign combinations of:

(0,1,2,2,3)

=== Images ===
Orthographic projections
Coxeter plane	B_{5}	B_{4} / D_{5}	B_{3} / D_{4} / A_{2}
Graph			
Dihedral symmetry	[10]	[8]	[6]
Coxeter plane	B_{2}	A_{3}	
Graph			
Dihedral symmetry	[4]	[4]	

== Runcicantitruncated 5-orthoplex ==
Runcicantitruncated 5-orthoplex
Type	Uniform 5-polytope
Schläfli symbol	t_{0,1,2,3}{3,3,3,4}
Coxeter-Dynkin diagram	
4-faces	162
Cells	1440
Faces	4160
Edges	4800
Vertices	1920
Vertex figure	Irregular 5-cell
Coxeter groups	B_{5} [4,3,3,3] D_{5} [3^{2,1,1}]
Properties	convex, isogonal

=== Alternate names ===
- Runcicantitruncated pentacross
- Great prismated triacontaditeron (gippit) (Jonathan Bowers)

=== Coordinates ===
The Cartesian coordinates of the vertices of a runcicantitruncated 5-orthoplex having an edge length of √2 are given by all permutations of coordinates and sign of:

$$\left(0, 1, 2, 3, 4\right)$$

=== Images ===
Orthographic projections
Coxeter plane	B_{5}	B_{4} / D_{5}	B_{3} / D_{4} / A_{2}
Graph			
Dihedral symmetry	[10]	[8]	[6]
Coxeter plane	B_{2}	A_{3}	
Graph			
Dihedral symmetry	[4]	[4]	

=== Snub 5-demicube ===
The snub 5-demicube defined as an alternation of the omnitruncated 5-demicube is not uniform, but it can be given Coxeter diagram or and symmetry [3^{2,1,1}]^{+} or [4,(3,3,3)^{+}], and constructed from 10 snub 24-cells, 32 snub 5-cells, 40 snub tetrahedral antiprisms, 80 2-3 duoantiprisms, and 960 irregular 5-cells filling the gaps at the deleted vertices.

== Related polytopes ==
These polytopes are from a set of 31 uniform 5-polytopes generated from the regular 5-cube or 5-orthoplex.

B5 polytopes
β_{5}	t_{1}β_{5}	t_{2}γ_{5}	t_{1}γ_{5}	γ_{5}	t_{0,1}β_{5}	t_{0,2}β_{5}	t_{1,2}β_{5}
t_{0,3}β_{5}	t_{1,3}γ_{5}	t_{1,2}γ_{5}	t_{0,4}γ_{5}	t_{0,3}γ_{5}	t_{0,2}γ_{5}	t_{0,1}γ_{5}	t_{0,1,2}β_{5}
t_{0,1,3}β_{5}	t_{0,2,3}β_{5}	t_{1,2,3}γ_{5}	t_{0,1,4}β_{5}	t_{0,2,4}γ_{5}	t_{0,2,3}γ_{5}	t_{0,1,4}γ_{5}	t_{0,1,3}γ_{5}
t_{0,1,2}γ_{5}	t_{0,1,2,3}β_{5}	t_{0,1,2,4}β_{5}	t_{0,1,3,4}γ_{5}	t_{0,1,2,4}γ_{5}	t_{0,1,2,3}γ_{5}	t_{0,1,2,3,4}γ_{5}	

== Notes ==
Fundamental convex regular and uniform polytopes in dimensions 2–10
Family	A_{n}	B_{n}	I_{2}(p) / D_{n}	E_{6} / E_{7} / E_{8} / F_{4} / G_{2}	H_{n}
Regular polygon	Triangle	Square	p-gon	Hexagon	Pentagon
Uniform polyhedron	Tetrahedron	Octahedron • Cube	Demicube		Dodecahedron • Icosahedron
Uniform polychoron	Pentachoron	16-cell • Tesseract	Demitesseract	24-cell	120-cell • 600-cell
Uniform 5-polytope	5-simplex	5-orthoplex • 5-cube	5-demicube		
Uniform 6-polytope	6-simplex	6-orthoplex • 6-cube	6-demicube	1_{22} • 2_{21}	
Uniform 7-polytope	7-simplex	7-orthoplex • 7-cube	7-demicube	1_{32} • 2_{31} • 3_{21}	
Uniform 8-polytope	8-simplex	8-orthoplex • 8-cube	8-demicube	1_{42} • 2_{41} • 4_{21}	
Uniform 9-polytope	9-simplex	9-orthoplex • 9-cube	9-demicube		
Uniform 10-polytope	10-simplex	10-orthoplex • 10-cube	10-demicube		
Uniform n-polytope	n-simplex	n-orthoplex • n-cube	n-demicube	1_{k2} • 2_{k1} • k_{21}	n-pentagonal polytope
Topics: Polytope families • Regular polytope • List of regular polytopes and compounds • Polytope operations
