= Cantellated 5-cubes =

5-cube	Cantellated 5-cube	Bicantellated 5-cube	Cantellated 5-orthoplex
5-orthoplex	Cantitruncated 5-cube	Bicantitruncated 5-cube	Cantitruncated 5-orthoplex
Orthogonal projections in B_{5} Coxeter plane

In six-dimensional geometry, a cantellated 5-cube is a convex uniform 5-polytope, being a cantellation of the regular 5-cube.

There are 6 unique cantellation for the 5-cube, including truncations. Half of them are more easily constructed from the dual 5-orthoplex

== Cantellated 5-cube ==
Cantellated 5-cube
Type	Uniform 5-polytope	
Schläfli symbol	rr{4,3,3,3} = $r\left\{\begin{array}{l}4\\3, 3, 3\end{array}\right\}$	
Coxeter-Dynkin diagram	=	
4-faces	122	10; 80; 32
Cells	680	40; 320; 160; 160
Faces	1520	80; 480; 320; 640
Edges	1280	320+960
Vertices	320	
Vertex figure		
Coxeter group	B_{5} [4,3,3,3]	
Properties	convex, uniform	

=== Alternate names ===
- Small rhombated penteract (Acronym: sirn) (Jonathan Bowers)

=== Coordinates ===
The Cartesian coordinates of the vertices of a cantellated 5-cube having edge length 2 are all permutations of:

$$\left(\pm1,\ \pm1,\ \pm(1+\sqrt{2}),\ \pm(1+\sqrt{2}),\ \pm(1+\sqrt{2})\right)$$

=== Images ===
Orthographic projections
Coxeter plane	B_{5}	B_{4} / D_{5}	B_{3} / D_{4} / A_{2}
Graph			
Dihedral symmetry	[10]	[8]	[6]
Coxeter plane	B_{2}	A_{3}	
Graph			
Dihedral symmetry	[4]	[4]	

== Bicantellated 5-cube ==
Bicantellated 5-cube
Type	Uniform 5-polytope	
Schläfli symbols	2rr{4,3,3,3} = $r\left\{\begin{array}{l}3, 4\\3, 3\end{array}\right\}$ r{3^{2,1,1}} = $r\left\{\begin{array}{l}3, 3\\ 3\\3\end{array}\right\}$	
Coxeter-Dynkin diagrams	=	
4-faces	122	10; 80; 32
Cells	840	40; 240; 160; 320; 80
Faces	2160	240; 320; 960; 320; 320
Edges	1920	960+960
Vertices	480	
Vertex figure		
Coxeter groups	B_{5}, [3,3,3,4] D_{5}, [3^{2,1,1}]	
Properties	convex, uniform	

In five-dimensional geometry, a bicantellated 5-cube is a uniform 5-polytope.

=== Alternate names ===
- Bicantellated penteract, bicantellated 5-orthoplex, or bicantellated pentacross
- Small birhombated penteractitriacontaditeron (Acronym: sibrant) (Jonathan Bowers)

=== Coordinates ===
The Cartesian coordinates of the vertices of a bicantellated 5-cube having edge length 2 are all permutations of:

(0,1,1,2,2)

=== Images ===
Orthographic projections
Coxeter plane	B_{5}	B_{4} / D_{5}	B_{3} / D_{4} / A_{2}
Graph			
Dihedral symmetry	[10]	[8]	[6]
Coxeter plane	B_{2}	A_{3}	
Graph			
Dihedral symmetry	[4]	[4]	

== Cantitruncated 5-cube ==
Cantitruncated 5-cube
Type	Uniform 5-polytope	
Schläfli symbol	tr{4,3,3,3} = $t\left\{\begin{array}{l}4\\3, 3, 3\end{array}\right\}$	
Coxeter-Dynkin diagram	=	
4-faces	122	10; 80; 32
Cells	680	40; 320; 160; 160
Faces	1520	80; 480; 320; 640
Edges	1600	320+320+960
Vertices	640	
Vertex figure		
Coxeter group	B_{5} [4,3,3,3]	
Properties	convex, uniform	

=== Alternate names ===
- Tricantitruncated 5-orthoplex / tricantitruncated pentacross
- Great rhombated penteract (girn) (Jonathan Bowers)

=== Coordinates ===
The Cartesian coordinates of the vertices of a cantitruncated 5-cube having an edge length of 2 are given by all permutations of coordinates and sign of:

$$\left(1,\ 1+\sqrt{2},\ 1+2\sqrt{2},\ 1+2\sqrt{2},\ 1+2\sqrt{2}\right)$$

=== Images ===
Orthographic projections
Coxeter plane	B_{5}	B_{4} / D_{5}	B_{3} / D_{4} / A_{2}
Graph			
Dihedral symmetry	[10]	[8]	[6]
Coxeter plane	B_{2}	A_{3}	
Graph			
Dihedral symmetry	[4]	[4]	

=== Related polytopes ===
It is third in a series of cantitruncated hypercubes:

Petrie polygon projections
Truncated cuboctahedron	Cantitruncated tesseract	Cantitruncated 5-cube	Cantitruncated 6-cube	Cantitruncated 7-cube	Cantitruncated 8-cube

== Bicantitruncated 5-cube ==
Bicantitruncated 5-cube
Type	uniform 5-polytope	
Schläfli symbol	2tr{3,3,3,4} = $t\left\{\begin{array}{l}3, 4\\3, 3\end{array}\right\}$ t{3^{2,1,1}} = $t\left\{\begin{array}{l}3, 3\\ 3\\3\end{array}\right\}$	
Coxeter-Dynkin diagrams	=	
4-faces	122	10; 80; 32
Cells	840	40; 240; 160; 320; 80
Faces	2160	240; 320; 960; 320; 320
Edges	2400	960+480+960
Vertices	960	
Vertex figure		
Coxeter groups	B_{5}, [3,3,3,4] D_{5}, [3^{2,1,1}]	
Properties	convex, uniform	

=== Alternate names ===
- Bicantitruncated penteract
- Bicantitruncated pentacross
- Great birhombated penteractitriacontaditeron (Acronym: gibrant) (Jonathan Bowers)

=== Coordinates ===
Cartesian coordinates for the vertices of a bicantitruncated 5-cube, centered at the origin, are all sign and coordinate permutations of

(±3,±3,±2,±1,0)

=== Images ===
Orthographic projections
Coxeter plane	B_{5}	B_{4} / D_{5}	B_{3} / D_{4} / A_{2}
Graph			
Dihedral symmetry	[10]	[8]	[6]
Coxeter plane	B_{2}	A_{3}	
Graph			
Dihedral symmetry	[4]	[4]	

== Related polytopes ==
These polytopes are from a set of 31 uniform 5-polytopes generated from the regular 5-cube or 5-orthoplex.

B5 polytopes
β_{5}	t_{1}β_{5}	t_{2}γ_{5}	t_{1}γ_{5}	γ_{5}	t_{0,1}β_{5}	t_{0,2}β_{5}	t_{1,2}β_{5}
t_{0,3}β_{5}	t_{1,3}γ_{5}	t_{1,2}γ_{5}	t_{0,4}γ_{5}	t_{0,3}γ_{5}	t_{0,2}γ_{5}	t_{0,1}γ_{5}	t_{0,1,2}β_{5}
t_{0,1,3}β_{5}	t_{0,2,3}β_{5}	t_{1,2,3}γ_{5}	t_{0,1,4}β_{5}	t_{0,2,4}γ_{5}	t_{0,2,3}γ_{5}	t_{0,1,4}γ_{5}	t_{0,1,3}γ_{5}
t_{0,1,2}γ_{5}	t_{0,1,2,3}β_{5}	t_{0,1,2,4}β_{5}	t_{0,1,3,4}γ_{5}	t_{0,1,2,4}γ_{5}	t_{0,1,2,3}γ_{5}	t_{0,1,2,3,4}γ_{5}	

== Notes ==
Fundamental convex regular and uniform polytopes
Family	A_{n}	B_{n}	I_{2}(p) / D_{n}	E_{6} / E_{7} / E_{8} / F_{4} / G_{2}	H_{n}
Regular polygon	Triangle	Square	p-gon	Hexagon	Pentagon
Uniform polyhedron	Tetrahedron	Octahedron • Cube	Demicube		Dodecahedron • Icosahedron
Uniform polychoron	Pentachoron	16-cell • Tesseract	Demitesseract	24-cell	120-cell • 600-cell
Uniform 5-polytope	5-simplex	5-orthoplex • 5-cube	5-demicube		
Uniform 6-polytope	6-simplex	6-orthoplex • 6-cube	6-demicube	1_{22} • 2_{21}	
Uniform 7-polytope	7-simplex	7-orthoplex • 7-cube	7-demicube	1_{32} • 2_{31} • 3_{21}	
Uniform 8-polytope	8-simplex	8-orthoplex • 8-cube	8-demicube	1_{42} • 2_{41} • 4_{21}	
Uniform n-polytope	n-simplex	n-orthoplex • n-cube	n-demicube	1_{k2} • 2_{k1} • k_{21}	n-pentagonal polytope
Topics: Polytope families • Regular polytope • List of regular polytopes and compounds • Polytope operations
