= Cantellated 5-orthoplexes =

| 5-orthoplex | Cantellated 5-orthoplex | Bicantellated 5-cube | Cantellated 5-cube |
| 5-cube | Cantitruncated 5-orthoplex | Bicantitruncated 5-cube | Cantitruncated 5-cube |
Orthogonal projections in B_{5} Coxeter plane

In five-dimensional geometry, a cantellated 5-orthoplex is a convex uniform 5-polytope, being a cantellation of the regular 5-orthoplex.

There are 6 cantellation for the 5-orthoplex, including truncations. Some of them are more easily constructed from the dual 5-cube.

== Cantellated 5-orthoplex ==
Cantellated 5-orthoplex
| Type | Uniform 5-polytope | |
| Schläfli symbol | rr{3,3,3,4} rr{3,3,3^{1,1}} | |
| Coxeter-Dynkin diagrams | | |
| 4-faces | 82 | 10; 40; 32 |
| Cells | 640 | 80; 160; 320; 80 |
| Faces | 1520 | 640; 320; 480; 80 |
| Edges | 1200 | 960; 240 |
| Vertices | 240 | |
| Vertex figure | Square pyramidal prism | |
| Coxeter group | B_{5}, [4,3,3,3], order 3840; D_{5}, [3^{2,1,1}], order 1920 | |
| Properties | convex | |

=== Alternate names ===
- Cantellated 5-orthoplex
- Bicantellated 5-demicube
- Small rhombated triacontaditeron (Acronym: sart) (Jonathan Bowers)

=== Coordinates ===
The vertices of the can be made in 5-space, as permutations and sign combinations of:

(0,0,1,1,2)

=== Images ===
The cantellated 5-orthoplex is constructed by a cantellation operation applied to the 5-orthoplex.

Orthographic projections
| Coxeter plane | B_{5} | B_{4} / D_{5} | B_{3} / D_{4} / A_{2} |
|---|---|---|---|
| Graph | | | |
| Dihedral symmetry | [10] | [8] | [6] |
| Coxeter plane | B_{2} | A_{3} | |
| Graph | | | |
| Dihedral symmetry | [4] | [4] | |

== Cantitruncated 5-orthoplex ==
Cantitruncated 5-orthoplex
| Type | uniform 5-polytope | |
| Schläfli symbol | tr{3,3,3,4} tr{3,3^{1,1}} | |
| Coxeter-Dynkin diagrams | | |
| 4-faces | 82 | 10; 40; 32 |
| Cells | 640 | 80; 160; 320; 80 |
| Faces | 1520 | 640; 320; 480; 80 |
| Edges | 1440 | 960; 240; 240 |
| Vertices | 480 | |
| Vertex figure | Square pyramidal pyramid | |
| Coxeter groups | B_{5}, [3,3,3,4], order 3840; D_{5}, [3^{2,1,1}], order 1920 | |
| Properties | convex | |

=== Alternate names ===
- Cantitruncated pentacross
- Cantitruncated triacontaditeron (Acronym: gart) (Jonathan Bowers)

=== Coordinates ===
Cartesian coordinates for the vertices of a cantitruncated 5-orthoplex, centered at the origin, are all sign and coordinate permutations of

(±3,±2,±1,0,0)

=== Images ===
Orthographic projections
| Coxeter plane | B_{5} | B_{4} / D_{5} | B_{3} / D_{4} / A_{2} |
|---|---|---|---|
| Graph | | | |
| Dihedral symmetry | [10] | [8] | [6] |
| Coxeter plane | B_{2} | A_{3} | |
| Graph | | | |
| Dihedral symmetry | [4] | [4] | |

== Related polytopes ==
These polytopes are from a set of 31 uniform 5-polytopes generated from the regular 5-cube or 5-orthoplex.

B5 polytopes
| β_{5} | t_{1}β_{5} | t_{2}γ_{5} | t_{1}γ_{5} | γ_{5} | t_{0,1}β_{5} | t_{0,2}β_{5} | t_{1,2}β_{5} |
| t_{0,3}β_{5} | t_{1,3}γ_{5} | t_{1,2}γ_{5} | t_{0,4}γ_{5} | t_{0,3}γ_{5} | t_{0,2}γ_{5} | t_{0,1}γ_{5} | t_{0,1,2}β_{5} |
| t_{0,1,3}β_{5} | t_{0,2,3}β_{5} | t_{1,2,3}γ_{5} | t_{0,1,4}β_{5} | t_{0,2,4}γ_{5} | t_{0,2,3}γ_{5} | t_{0,1,4}γ_{5} | t_{0,1,3}γ_{5} |
| t_{0,1,2}γ_{5} | t_{0,1,2,3}β_{5} | t_{0,1,2,4}β_{5} | t_{0,1,3,4}γ_{5} | t_{0,1,2,4}γ_{5} | t_{0,1,2,3}γ_{5} | t_{0,1,2,3,4}γ_{5} | |

== Notes ==
Fundamental convex regular and uniform polytopes in dimensions 2–10
| Family | A_{n} | B_{n} | I_{2}(p) / D_{n} | E_{6} / E_{7} / E_{8} / F_{4} / G_{2} | H_{n} |
| Regular polygon | Triangle | Square | p-gon | Hexagon | Pentagon |
| Uniform polyhedron | Tetrahedron | Octahedron • Cube | Demicube | | Dodecahedron • Icosahedron |
| Uniform polychoron | Pentachoron | 16-cell • Tesseract | Demitesseract | 24-cell | 120-cell • 600-cell |
| Uniform 5-polytope | 5-simplex | 5-orthoplex • 5-cube | 5-demicube | | |
| Uniform 6-polytope | 6-simplex | 6-orthoplex • 6-cube | 6-demicube | 1_{22} • 2_{21} | |
| Uniform 7-polytope | 7-simplex | 7-orthoplex • 7-cube | 7-demicube | 1_{32} • 2_{31} • 3_{21} | |
| Uniform 8-polytope | 8-simplex | 8-orthoplex • 8-cube | 8-demicube | 1_{42} • 2_{41} • 4_{21} | |
| Uniform 9-polytope | 9-simplex | 9-orthoplex • 9-cube | 9-demicube | | |
| Uniform 10-polytope | 10-simplex | 10-orthoplex • 10-cube | 10-demicube | | |
| Uniform n-polytope | n-simplex | n-orthoplex • n-cube | n-demicube | 1_{k2} • 2_{k1} • k_{21} | n-pentagonal polytope |
Topics: Polytope families • Regular polytope • List of regular polytopes and compounds • Polytope operations
