= Runcinated 5-cubes =

5-cube	Runcinated 5-cube	Runcinated 5-orthoplex
Runcitruncated 5-cube	Runcicantellated 5-cube	Runcicantitruncated 5-cube
Runcitruncated 5-orthoplex	Runcicantellated 5-orthoplex	Runcicantitruncated 5-orthoplex
Orthogonal projections in B_{5} Coxeter plane

In five-dimensional geometry, a runcinated 5-cube is a convex uniform 5-polytope that is a runcination (a 3rd order truncation) of the regular 5-cube.

There are 8 unique degrees of runcinations of the 5-cube, along with permutations of truncations and cantellations. Four are more simply constructed relative to the 5-orthoplex.

== Runcinated 5-cube ==
Runcinated 5-cube
Type	Uniform 5-polytope	
Schläfli symbol	t_{0,3}{4,3,3,3}	
Coxeter diagram		
4-faces	202	10; 80; 80; 32
Cells	1240	40; 240; 320; 160; 320; 160
Faces	2160	240; 960; 640; 320
Edges	1440	480+960
Vertices	320	
Vertex figure		
Coxeter group	B_{5} [4,3,3,3]	
Properties	convex	

=== Alternate names ===
- Small prismated penteract (Acronym: span) (Jonathan Bowers)

=== Coordinates ===
The Cartesian coordinates of the vertices of a runcinated 5-cube having edge length 2 are all permutations of:

$$\left(\pm1,\ \pm1,\ \pm1,\ \pm(1+\sqrt{2}),\ \pm(1+\sqrt{2})\right)$$

=== Images ===
Orthographic projections
Coxeter plane	B_{5}	B_{4} / D_{5}	B_{3} / D_{4} / A_{2}
Graph			
Dihedral symmetry	[10]	[8]	[6]
Coxeter plane	B_{2}	A_{3}	
Graph			
Dihedral symmetry	[4]	[4]	

== Runcitruncated 5-cube ==
Runcitruncated 5-cube
Type	Uniform 5-polytope	
Schläfli symbol	t_{0,1,3}{4,3,3,3}	
Coxeter-Dynkin diagrams		
4-faces	202	10; 80; 80; 32
Cells	1560	40; 240; 320; 320; 160; 320; 160
Faces	3760	240; 960; 320; 960; 640; 640
Edges	3360	480+960+1920
Vertices	960	
Vertex figure		
Coxeter group	B_{5}, [3,3,3,4]	
Properties	convex	

=== Alternate names ===
- Runcitruncated penteract
- Prismatotruncated penteract (Acronym: pattin) (Jonathan Bowers)

=== Construction and coordinates ===
The Cartesian coordinates of the vertices of a runcitruncated 5-cube having edge length 2 are all permutations of:

$$\left(\pm1,\ \pm(1+\sqrt{2}),\ \pm(1+\sqrt{2}),\ \pm(1+2\sqrt{2}),\ \pm(1+2\sqrt{2})\right)$$

=== Images ===
Orthographic projections
Coxeter plane	B_{5}	B_{4} / D_{5}	B_{3} / D_{4} / A_{2}
Graph			
Dihedral symmetry	[10]	[8]	[6]
Coxeter plane	B_{2}	A_{3}	
Graph			
Dihedral symmetry	[4]	[4]	

== Runcicantellated 5-cube ==
Runcicantellated 5-cube
Type	Uniform 5-polytope	
Schläfli symbol	t_{0,2,3}{4,3,3,3}	
Coxeter-Dynkin diagram		
4-faces	202	10; 80; 80; 32
Cells	1240	40; 240; 320; 320; 160; 160
Faces	2960	240; 480; 960; 320; 640; 320
Edges	2880	960+960+960
Vertices	960	
Vertex figure		
Coxeter group	B_{5} [4,3,3,3]	
Properties	convex	

=== Alternate names ===
- Runcicantellated penteract
- Prismatorhombated penteract (Acronym: prin) (Jonathan Bowers)

=== Coordinates ===
The Cartesian coordinates of the vertices of a runcicantellated 5-cube having edge length 2 are all permutations of:

$$\left(\pm1,\ \pm1,\ \pm(1+\sqrt{2}),\ \pm(1+2\sqrt{2}),\ \pm(1+2\sqrt{2})\right)$$

=== Images ===
Orthographic projections
Coxeter plane	B_{5}	B_{4} / D_{5}	B_{3} / D_{4} / A_{2}
Graph			
Dihedral symmetry	[10]	[8]	[6]
Coxeter plane	B_{2}	A_{3}	
Graph			
Dihedral symmetry	[4]	[4]	

== Runcicantitruncated 5-cube ==
Runcicantitruncated 5-cube
Type	Uniform 5-polytope
Schläfli symbol	t_{0,1,2,3}{4,3,3,3}
Coxeter-Dynkin diagram	
4-faces	202
Cells	1560
Faces	4240
Edges	4800
Vertices	1920
Vertex figure	Irregular 5-cell
Coxeter group	B_{5} [4,3,3,3]
Properties	convex, isogonal

=== Alternate names ===
- Runcicantitruncated penteract
- Biruncicantitruncated pentacross
- Great prismated penteract (Acronym: gippin) (Jonathan Bowers)

=== Coordinates ===
The Cartesian coordinates of the vertices of a runcicantitruncated 5-cube having an edge length of 2 are given by all permutations of coordinates and sign of:

$$\left(1,\ 1+\sqrt{2},\ 1+2\sqrt{2},\ 1+3\sqrt{2},\ 1+3\sqrt{2}\right)$$

=== Images ===
Orthographic projections
Coxeter plane	B_{5}	B_{4} / D_{5}	B_{3} / D_{4} / A_{2}
Graph			
Dihedral symmetry	[10]	[8]	[6]
Coxeter plane	B_{2}	A_{3}	
Graph			
Dihedral symmetry	[4]	[4]	

== Related polytopes ==
These polytopes are a part of a set of 31 uniform polytera generated from the regular 5-cube or 5-orthoplex.

B5 polytopes
β_{5}	t_{1}β_{5}	t_{2}γ_{5}	t_{1}γ_{5}	γ_{5}	t_{0,1}β_{5}	t_{0,2}β_{5}	t_{1,2}β_{5}
t_{0,3}β_{5}	t_{1,3}γ_{5}	t_{1,2}γ_{5}	t_{0,4}γ_{5}	t_{0,3}γ_{5}	t_{0,2}γ_{5}	t_{0,1}γ_{5}	t_{0,1,2}β_{5}
t_{0,1,3}β_{5}	t_{0,2,3}β_{5}	t_{1,2,3}γ_{5}	t_{0,1,4}β_{5}	t_{0,2,4}γ_{5}	t_{0,2,3}γ_{5}	t_{0,1,4}γ_{5}	t_{0,1,3}γ_{5}
t_{0,1,2}γ_{5}	t_{0,1,2,3}β_{5}	t_{0,1,2,4}β_{5}	t_{0,1,3,4}γ_{5}	t_{0,1,2,4}γ_{5}	t_{0,1,2,3}γ_{5}	t_{0,1,2,3,4}γ_{5}	

== Notes ==
Fundamental convex regular and uniform polytopes
Family	A_{n}	B_{n}	I_{2}(p) / D_{n}	E_{6} / E_{7} / E_{8} / F_{4} / G_{2}	H_{n}
Regular polygon	Triangle	Square	p-gon	Hexagon	Pentagon
Uniform polyhedron	Tetrahedron	Octahedron • Cube	Demicube		Dodecahedron • Icosahedron
Uniform polychoron	Pentachoron	16-cell • Tesseract	Demitesseract	24-cell	120-cell • 600-cell
Uniform 5-polytope	5-simplex	5-orthoplex • 5-cube	5-demicube		
Uniform 6-polytope	6-simplex	6-orthoplex • 6-cube	6-demicube	1_{22} • 2_{21}	
Uniform 7-polytope	7-simplex	7-orthoplex • 7-cube	7-demicube	1_{32} • 2_{31} • 3_{21}	
Uniform 8-polytope	8-simplex	8-orthoplex • 8-cube	8-demicube	1_{42} • 2_{41} • 4_{21}	
Uniform n-polytope	n-simplex	n-orthoplex • n-cube	n-demicube	1_{k2} • 2_{k1} • k_{21}	n-pentagonal polytope
Topics: Polytope families • Regular polytope • List of regular polytopes and compounds • Polytope operations
