= Truncated 5-orthoplexes =

5-orthoplex	Truncated 5-orthoplex	Bitruncated 5-orthoplex
5-cube	Truncated 5-cube	Bitruncated 5-cube
Orthogonal projections in B_{5} Coxeter plane

In five-dimensional geometry, a truncated 5-orthoplex is a convex uniform 5-polytope, being a truncation of the regular 5-orthoplex.

There are 4 unique truncations of the 5-orthoplex. Vertices of the truncation 5-orthoplex are located as pairs on the edge of the 5-orthoplex. Vertices of the bitruncated 5-orthoplex are located on the triangular faces of the 5-orthoplex. The third and fourth truncations are more easily constructed as second and first truncations of the 5-cube.

== Truncated 5-orthoplex ==
Truncated 5-orthoplex
Type	uniform 5-polytope	
Schläfli symbol	t{3,3,3,4} t{3,3^{1,1}}	
Coxeter-Dynkin diagrams		
4-faces	42	10; 32
Cells	240	160; 80
Faces	400	320; 80
Edges	280	240; 40
Vertices	80	
Vertex figure	( )v{3,4}	
Coxeter groups	B_{5}, [3,3,3,4], order 3840; D_{5}, [3^{2,1,1}], order 1920	
Properties	convex	

=== Alternate names ===
- Truncated pentacross
- Truncated triacontaditeron (Acronym: tot) (Jonathan Bowers)

=== Coordinates ===
Cartesian coordinates for the vertices of a truncated 5-orthoplex, centered at the origin, are all 80 vertices are sign (4) and coordinate (20) permutations of

(±2,±1,0,0,0)

=== Images ===
The truncated 5-orthoplex is constructed by a truncation operation applied to the 5-orthoplex. All edges are shortened, and two new vertices are added on each original edge.

Orthographic projections
Coxeter plane	B_{5}	B_{4} / D_{5}	B_{3} / D_{4} / A_{2}
Graph			
Dihedral symmetry	[10]	[8]	[6]
Coxeter plane	B_{2}	A_{3}	
Graph			
Dihedral symmetry	[4]	[4]	

== Bitruncated 5-orthoplex ==
Bitruncated 5-orthoplex
Type	uniform 5-polytope	
Schläfli symbol	2t{3,3,3,4} 2t{3,3^{1,1}}	
Coxeter-Dynkin diagrams		
4-faces	42	10; 32
Cells	280	40; 160; 80
Faces	720	320; 320; 80
Edges	720	480; 240
Vertices	240	
Vertex figure	{ }v{4}	
Coxeter groups	B_{5}, [3,3,3,4], order 3840; D_{5}, [3^{2,1,1}], order 1920	
Properties	convex	

The bitruncated 5-orthoplex can tessellate space in the tritruncated 5-cubic honeycomb.

=== Alternate names ===
- Bitruncated pentacross
- Bitruncated triacontaditeron (Acronym: bittit) (Jonathan Bowers)

=== Coordinates ===
Cartesian coordinates for the vertices of a truncated 5-orthoplex, centered at the origin, are all 80 vertices are sign and coordinate permutations of

(±2,±2,±1,0,0)

=== Images ===
The bitruncated 5-orthoplex is constructed by a bitruncation operation applied to the 5-orthoplex.

Orthographic projections
Coxeter plane	B_{5}	B_{4} / D_{5}	B_{3} / D_{4} / A_{2}
Graph			
Dihedral symmetry	[10]	[8]	[6]
Coxeter plane	B_{2}	A_{3}	
Graph			
Dihedral symmetry	[4]	[4]	

== Related polytopes ==
The truncated 5-orthoplex and bitruncated 5-orthoplex are from the family of 31 uniform 5-polytopes generated from the regular 5-cube or 5-orthoplex.

B5 polytopes
β_{5}	t_{1}β_{5}	t_{2}γ_{5}	t_{1}γ_{5}	γ_{5}	t_{0,1}β_{5}	t_{0,2}β_{5}	t_{1,2}β_{5}
t_{0,3}β_{5}	t_{1,3}γ_{5}	t_{1,2}γ_{5}	t_{0,4}γ_{5}	t_{0,3}γ_{5}	t_{0,2}γ_{5}	t_{0,1}γ_{5}	t_{0,1,2}β_{5}
t_{0,1,3}β_{5}	t_{0,2,3}β_{5}	t_{1,2,3}γ_{5}	t_{0,1,4}β_{5}	t_{0,2,4}γ_{5}	t_{0,2,3}γ_{5}	t_{0,1,4}γ_{5}	t_{0,1,3}γ_{5}
t_{0,1,2}γ_{5}	t_{0,1,2,3}β_{5}	t_{0,1,2,4}β_{5}	t_{0,1,3,4}γ_{5}	t_{0,1,2,4}γ_{5}	t_{0,1,2,3}γ_{5}	t_{0,1,2,3,4}γ_{5}	

== Notes ==
Fundamental convex regular and uniform polytopes in dimensions 2–10
Family	A_{n}	B_{n}	I_{2}(p) / D_{n}	E_{6} / E_{7} / E_{8} / F_{4} / G_{2}	H_{n}
Regular polygon	Triangle	Square	p-gon	Hexagon	Pentagon
Uniform polyhedron	Tetrahedron	Octahedron • Cube	Demicube		Dodecahedron • Icosahedron
Uniform polychoron	Pentachoron	16-cell • Tesseract	Demitesseract	24-cell	120-cell • 600-cell
Uniform 5-polytope	5-simplex	5-orthoplex • 5-cube	5-demicube		
Uniform 6-polytope	6-simplex	6-orthoplex • 6-cube	6-demicube	1_{22} • 2_{21}	
Uniform 7-polytope	7-simplex	7-orthoplex • 7-cube	7-demicube	1_{32} • 2_{31} • 3_{21}	
Uniform 8-polytope	8-simplex	8-orthoplex • 8-cube	8-demicube	1_{42} • 2_{41} • 4_{21}	
Uniform 9-polytope	9-simplex	9-orthoplex • 9-cube	9-demicube		
Uniform 10-polytope	10-simplex	10-orthoplex • 10-cube	10-demicube		
Uniform n-polytope	n-simplex	n-orthoplex • n-cube	n-demicube	1_{k2} • 2_{k1} • k_{21}	n-pentagonal polytope
Topics: Polytope families • Regular polytope • List of regular polytopes and compounds • Polytope operations
