= Truncated 5-cubes =

5-cube	Truncated 5-cube	Bitruncated 5-cube
5-orthoplex	Truncated 5-orthoplex	Bitruncated 5-orthoplex
Orthogonal projections in B_{5} Coxeter plane

In five-dimensional geometry, a truncated 5-cube is a convex uniform 5-polytope, being a truncation of the regular 5-cube.

There are four unique truncations of the 5-cube. Vertices of the truncated 5-cube are located as pairs on the edge of the 5-cube. Vertices of the bitruncated 5-cube are located on the square faces of the 5-cube. The third and fourth truncations are more easily constructed as second and first truncations of the 5-orthoplex.

== Truncated 5-cube ==
Truncated 5-cube
Type	uniform 5-polytope	
Schläfli symbol	t{4,3,3,3}	
Coxeter-Dynkin diagram		
4-faces	42	10; 32
Cells	200	40; 160
Faces	400	80; 320
Edges	400	80; 320
Vertices	160	
Vertex figure	( )v{3,3}	
Coxeter group	B_{5}, [3,3,3,4], order 3840	
Properties	convex	

=== Alternate names ===
- Truncated penteract (Acronym: tan) (Jonathan Bowers)

=== Construction and coordinates ===
The truncated 5-cube may be constructed by truncating the vertices of the 5-cube at $1/(\sqrt{2}+2)$ of the edge length. A regular 5-cell is formed at each truncated vertex.

The Cartesian coordinates of the vertices of a truncated 5-cube having edge length 2 are all permutations of:

$$\left(\pm1,\ \pm(1+\sqrt{2}),\ \pm(1+\sqrt{2}),\ \pm(1+\sqrt{2}),\ \pm(1+\sqrt{2})\right)$$

=== Images ===
The truncated 5-cube is constructed by a truncation applied to the 5-cube. All edges are shortened, and two new vertices are added on each original edge.

Orthographic projections
Coxeter plane	B_{5}	B_{4} / D_{5}	B_{3} / D_{4} / A_{2}
Graph			
Dihedral symmetry	[10]	[8]	[6]
Coxeter plane	B_{2}	A_{3}	
Graph			
Dihedral symmetry	[4]	[4]	

=== Related polytopes ===
The truncated 5-cube, is fourth in a sequence of truncated hypercubes:

Truncated hypercubes
Image								...
Name	Octagon	Truncated cube	Truncated tesseract	Truncated 5-cube	Truncated 6-cube	Truncated 7-cube	Truncated 8-cube	...
Coxeter diagram								...
Vertex figure	( )v( )	( )v{ }	( )v{3}	( )v{3,3}	( )v{3,3,3}	( )v{3,3,3,3}	( )v{3,3,3,3,3}	

== Bitruncated 5-cube ==
Bitruncated 5-cube
Type	uniform 5-polytope	
Schläfli symbol	2t{4,3,3,3}	
Coxeter-Dynkin diagrams		
4-faces	42	10; 32
Cells	280	40; 160; 80
Faces	720	80; 320; 320
Edges	800	320; 480
Vertices	320	
Vertex figure	{ }v{3}	
Coxeter groups	B_{5}, [3,3,3,4], order 3840	
Properties	convex	

=== Alternate names ===
- Bitruncated penteract (Acronym: bittin) (Jonathan Bowers)

=== Construction and coordinates ===
The bitruncated 5-cube may be constructed by bitruncating the vertices of the 5-cube at $\sqrt{2}$ of the edge length.

The Cartesian coordinates of the vertices of a bitruncated 5-cube having edge length 2 are all permutations of:

$$\left(0,\ \pm1,\ \pm2,\ \pm2,\ \pm2\right)$$

=== Images ===
Orthographic projections
Coxeter plane	B_{5}	B_{4} / D_{5}	B_{3} / D_{4} / A_{2}
Graph			
Dihedral symmetry	[10]	[8]	[6]
Coxeter plane	B_{2}	A_{3}	
Graph			
Dihedral symmetry	[4]	[4]	

=== Related polytopes ===
The bitruncated 5-cube is third in a sequence of bitruncated hypercubes:

Bitruncated hypercubes
Image							...
Name	Bitruncated cube	Bitruncated tesseract	Bitruncated 5-cube	Bitruncated 6-cube	Bitruncated 7-cube	Bitruncated 8-cube	...
Coxeter							...
Vertex figure	( )v{ }	{ }v{ }	{ }v{3}	{ }v{3,3}	{ }v{3,3,3}	{ }v{3,3,3,3}	

== Related polytopes ==
The truncated 5-cube and bitruncated 5-cube are from the family of 31 uniform 5-polytopes generated from the regular 5-cube or 5-orthoplex.

B5 polytopes
β_{5}	t_{1}β_{5}	t_{2}γ_{5}	t_{1}γ_{5}	γ_{5}	t_{0,1}β_{5}	t_{0,2}β_{5}	t_{1,2}β_{5}
t_{0,3}β_{5}	t_{1,3}γ_{5}	t_{1,2}γ_{5}	t_{0,4}γ_{5}	t_{0,3}γ_{5}	t_{0,2}γ_{5}	t_{0,1}γ_{5}	t_{0,1,2}β_{5}
t_{0,1,3}β_{5}	t_{0,2,3}β_{5}	t_{1,2,3}γ_{5}	t_{0,1,4}β_{5}	t_{0,2,4}γ_{5}	t_{0,2,3}γ_{5}	t_{0,1,4}γ_{5}	t_{0,1,3}γ_{5}
t_{0,1,2}γ_{5}	t_{0,1,2,3}β_{5}	t_{0,1,2,4}β_{5}	t_{0,1,3,4}γ_{5}	t_{0,1,2,4}γ_{5}	t_{0,1,2,3}γ_{5}	t_{0,1,2,3,4}γ_{5}	

== Notes ==
Fundamental convex regular and uniform polytopes in dimensions 2–10
Family	A_{n}	B_{n}	I_{2}(p) / D_{n}	E_{6} / E_{7} / E_{8} / F_{4} / G_{2}	H_{n}
Regular polygon	Triangle	Square	p-gon	Hexagon	Pentagon
Uniform polyhedron	Tetrahedron	Octahedron • Cube	Demicube		Dodecahedron • Icosahedron
Uniform polychoron	Pentachoron	16-cell • Tesseract	Demitesseract	24-cell	120-cell • 600-cell
Uniform 5-polytope	5-simplex	5-orthoplex • 5-cube	5-demicube		
Uniform 6-polytope	6-simplex	6-orthoplex • 6-cube	6-demicube	1_{22} • 2_{21}	
Uniform 7-polytope	7-simplex	7-orthoplex • 7-cube	7-demicube	1_{32} • 2_{31} • 3_{21}	
Uniform 8-polytope	8-simplex	8-orthoplex • 8-cube	8-demicube	1_{42} • 2_{41} • 4_{21}	
Uniform 9-polytope	9-simplex	9-orthoplex • 9-cube	9-demicube		
Uniform 10-polytope	10-simplex	10-orthoplex • 10-cube	10-demicube		
Uniform n-polytope	n-simplex	n-orthoplex • n-cube	n-demicube	1_{k2} • 2_{k1} • k_{21}	n-pentagonal polytope
Topics: Polytope families • Regular polytope • List of regular polytopes and compounds • Polytope operations
