= Rectified 5-cubes =

5-cube	Rectified 5-cube	Birectified 5-cube Birectified 5-orthoplex
5-orthoplex	Rectified 5-orthoplex	Birectified 5-cube Birectified 5-orthoplex
Orthogonal projections in A_{5} Coxeter plane

In five-dimensional geometry, a rectified 5-cube is a convex uniform 5-polytope, being a rectification of the regular 5-cube.

There are 5 degrees of rectifications of a 5-polytope, the zeroth here being the 5-cube, and the 4th and last being the 5-orthoplex. Vertices of the rectified 5-cube are located at the edge-centers of the 5-cube. Vertices of the birectified 5-cube are located in the square face centers of the 5-cube.

== Rectified 5-cube ==
Rectified 5-cube rectified penteract (rin)
Type	uniform 5-polytope	
Schläfli symbol	r{4,3,3,3}	
Coxeter diagram	=	
4-faces	42	10; 32
Cells	200	40; 160
Faces	400	80; 320
Edges	320	
Vertices	80	
Vertex figure	Tetrahedral prism	
Coxeter group	B_{5}, [4,3^{3}], order 3840	
Dual		
Base point	(0,1,1,1,1,1)√2	
Circumradius	sqrt(2) = 1.414214	
Properties	convex, isogonal	

=== Alternate names ===
- Rectified penteract (acronym: rin) (Jonathan Bowers)

=== Construction ===
The rectified 5-cube may be constructed from the 5-cube by truncating its vertices at the midpoints of its edges.

=== Coordinates ===
The Cartesian coordinates of the vertices of the rectified 5-cube with edge length $\sqrt{2}$ is given by all permutations of:

$$(0,\ \pm1,\ \pm1,\ \pm1,\ \pm1)$$

=== Images ===
Orthographic projections
Coxeter plane	B_{5}	B_{4} / D_{5}	B_{3} / D_{4} / A_{2}
Graph			
Dihedral symmetry	[10]	[8]	[6]
Coxeter plane	B_{2}	A_{3}	
Graph			
Dihedral symmetry	[4]	[4]	

== Birectified 5-cube ==
Birectified 5-cube birectified penteract (nit)
Type	uniform 5-polytope	
Schläfli symbol	2r{4,3,3,3}	
Coxeter diagram	=	
4-faces	42	10; 32
Cells	280	40; 160; 80
Faces	640	320; 320
Edges	480	
Vertices	80	
Vertex figure	{3}×{4}	
Coxeter group	B_{5}, [4,3^{3}], order 3840; D_{5}, [3^{2,1,1}], order 1920	
Dual		
Base point	(0,0,1,1,1,1)√2	
Circumradius	sqrt(3/2) = 1.224745	
Properties	convex, isogonal	

E. L. Elte identified it in 1912 as a semiregular polytope, identifying it as Cr_{5}^{2} as a second rectification of a 5-dimensional cross polytope.

=== Alternate names ===
- Birectified 5-cube/penteract
- Birectified pentacross/5-orthoplex/triacontaditeron
- Penteractitriacontaditeron (acronym: nit) (Jonathan Bowers)
- Rectified 5-demicube/demipenteract

=== Construction and coordinates ===
The birectified 5-cube may be constructed by birectifying the vertices of the 5-cube at $\sqrt{2}$ of the edge length.

The Cartesian coordinates of the vertices of a birectified 5-cube having edge length 2 are all permutations of:

$$\left(0,\ 0,\ \pm1,\ \pm1,\ \pm1\right)$$

=== Images ===
Orthographic projections
Coxeter plane	B_{5}	B_{4} / D_{5}	B_{3} / D_{4} / A_{2}
Graph			
Dihedral symmetry	[10]	[8]	[6]
Coxeter plane	B_{2}	A_{3}	
Graph			
Dihedral symmetry	[4]	[4]	

=== Related polytopes ===
2-isotopic hypercubes
Dim.	2	3	4	5	6	7	8	n
Name	t{4}	r{4,3}	2t{4,3,3}	2r{4,3,3,3}	3t{4,3,3,3,3}	3r{4,3,3,3,3,3}	4t{4,3,3,3,3,3,3}	...
Coxeter diagram								...
Images								...
Facets		{3} {4}	t{3,3} t{3,4}	r{3,3,3} r{3,3,4}	2t{3,3,3,3} 2t{3,3,3,4}	2r{3,3,3,3,3} 2r{3,3,3,3,4}	3t{3,3,3,3,3,3} 3t{3,3,3,3,3,4}	...
Vertex figure	( )v( )	{ }×{ }	{ }v{ }	{3}×{4}	{3}v{4}	{3,3}×{3,4}	{3,3}v{3,4}	...

== Related polytopes ==
These polytopes are a part of 31 uniform polytera generated from the regular 5-cube or 5-orthoplex.

B5 polytopes
β_{5}	t_{1}β_{5}	t_{2}γ_{5}	t_{1}γ_{5}	γ_{5}	t_{0,1}β_{5}	t_{0,2}β_{5}	t_{1,2}β_{5}
t_{0,3}β_{5}	t_{1,3}γ_{5}	t_{1,2}γ_{5}	t_{0,4}γ_{5}	t_{0,3}γ_{5}	t_{0,2}γ_{5}	t_{0,1}γ_{5}	t_{0,1,2}β_{5}
t_{0,1,3}β_{5}	t_{0,2,3}β_{5}	t_{1,2,3}γ_{5}	t_{0,1,4}β_{5}	t_{0,2,4}γ_{5}	t_{0,2,3}γ_{5}	t_{0,1,4}γ_{5}	t_{0,1,3}γ_{5}
t_{0,1,2}γ_{5}	t_{0,1,2,3}β_{5}	t_{0,1,2,4}β_{5}	t_{0,1,3,4}γ_{5}	t_{0,1,2,4}γ_{5}	t_{0,1,2,3}γ_{5}	t_{0,1,2,3,4}γ_{5}	

== Notes ==
Fundamental convex regular and uniform polytopes in dimensions 2–10
Family	A_{n}	B_{n}	I_{2}(p) / D_{n}	E_{6} / E_{7} / E_{8} / F_{4} / G_{2}	H_{n}
Regular polygon	Triangle	Square	p-gon	Hexagon	Pentagon
Uniform polyhedron	Tetrahedron	Octahedron • Cube	Demicube		Dodecahedron • Icosahedron
Uniform polychoron	Pentachoron	16-cell • Tesseract	Demitesseract	24-cell	120-cell • 600-cell
Uniform 5-polytope	5-simplex	5-orthoplex • 5-cube	5-demicube		
Uniform 6-polytope	6-simplex	6-orthoplex • 6-cube	6-demicube	1_{22} • 2_{21}	
Uniform 7-polytope	7-simplex	7-orthoplex • 7-cube	7-demicube	1_{32} • 2_{31} • 3_{21}	
Uniform 8-polytope	8-simplex	8-orthoplex • 8-cube	8-demicube	1_{42} • 2_{41} • 4_{21}	
Uniform 9-polytope	9-simplex	9-orthoplex • 9-cube	9-demicube		
Uniform 10-polytope	10-simplex	10-orthoplex • 10-cube	10-demicube		
Uniform n-polytope	n-simplex	n-orthoplex • n-cube	n-demicube	1_{k2} • 2_{k1} • k_{21}	n-pentagonal polytope
Topics: Polytope families • Regular polytope • List of regular polytopes and compounds • Polytope operations
