= 5-orthoplex =

Convex regular 5-polytope in geometry

Regular 5-orthoplex Pentacross
Orthogonal projection inside Petrie polygon
Type	Regular 5-polytope
Family	orthoplex
Schläfli symbol	{3,3,3,4} {3,3,3^{1,1}}
Coxeter-Dynkin diagrams	
4-faces	32 {3,3,3}
Cells	80 {3,3}
Faces	80 {3}
Edges	40
Vertices	10
Vertex figure	16-cell
Petrie polygon	decagon
Coxeter groups	BC_{5}, [3,3,3,4] D_{5}, [3^{2,1,1}]
Dual	5-cube
Properties	convex, Hanner polytope

In five-dimensional geometry, a 5-orthoplex, or 5-cross polytope, is a five-dimensional polytope with 10 vertices, 40 edges, 80 triangle faces, 80 tetrahedron cells, 32 5-cell 4-faces.

It has two constructed forms, the first being regular with Schläfli symbol {3^{3},4}, and the second with alternately labeled (checkerboarded) facets, with Schläfli symbol {3,3,3^{1,1}} or Coxeter symbol 2_{11}.

It is a part of an infinite family of polytopes, called cross-polytopes or orthoplexes. The dual polytope is the 5-hypercube or 5-cube.

== Alternate names ==
- Pentacross, derived from combining the family name cross polytope with pente for five (dimensions) in Greek.
- Triacontaditeron (or triacontakaiditeron) - as a 32-facetted 5-polytope (polyteron). Acronym: tac

== As a configuration ==
This configuration matrix represents the 5-orthoplex. The rows and columns correspond to vertices, edges, faces, cells and 4-faces. The diagonal numbers say how many of each element occur in the whole 5-orthoplex. The nondiagonal numbers say how many of the column's element occur in or at the row's element.

$$\begin{bmatrix}\begin{matrix}
10 & 8 & 24 & 32 & 16 \\
2 & 40 & 6 & 12 & 8 \\
3 & 3 & 80 & 4 & 4 \\
4 & 6 & 4 & 80 & 2 \\
5 & 10 & 10 & 5 & 32
\end{matrix}\end{bmatrix}$$

== Cartesian coordinates ==
Cartesian coordinates for the vertices of a 5-orthoplex, centered at the origin are

(±1,0,0,0,0), (0,±1,0,0,0), (0,0,±1,0,0), (0,0,0,±1,0), (0,0,0,0,±1)

== Construction ==
There are three Coxeter groups associated with the 5-orthoplex, one regular, dual of the penteract with the C_{5} or [4,3,3,3] Coxeter group, and a lower symmetry with two copies of 5-cell facets, alternating, with the D_{5} or [3^{2,1,1}] Coxeter group, and the final one as a dual 5-orthotope, called a 5-fusil which can have a variety of subsymmetries.

Name	Coxeter diagram	Schläfli symbol	Symmetry	Order	Vertex figure(s)
regular 5-orthoplex		{3,3,3,4}	[3,3,3,4]	3840	
Quasiregular 5-orthoplex		{3,3,3^{1,1}}	[3,3,3^{1,1}]	1920	
5-fusil
5-fusil		{3,3,3,4}	[4,3,3,3]	3840	
5-fusil		{3,3,4}+{}	[4,3,3,2]	768	
5-fusil		{3,4}+{4}	[4,3,2,4]	384	
5-fusil		{3,4}+2{}	[4,3,2,2]	192	
5-fusil		2{4}+{}	[4,2,4,2]	128	
5-fusil		{4}+3{}	[4,2,2,2]	64	
5-fusil		5{}	[2,2,2,2]	32	

== Other images ==
Orthographic projections
Coxeter plane	B_{5}	B_{4} / D_{5}	B_{3} / D_{4} / A_{2}
Graph			
Dihedral symmetry	[10]	[8]	[6]
Coxeter plane	B_{2}	A_{3}	
Graph			
Dihedral symmetry	[4]	[4]	

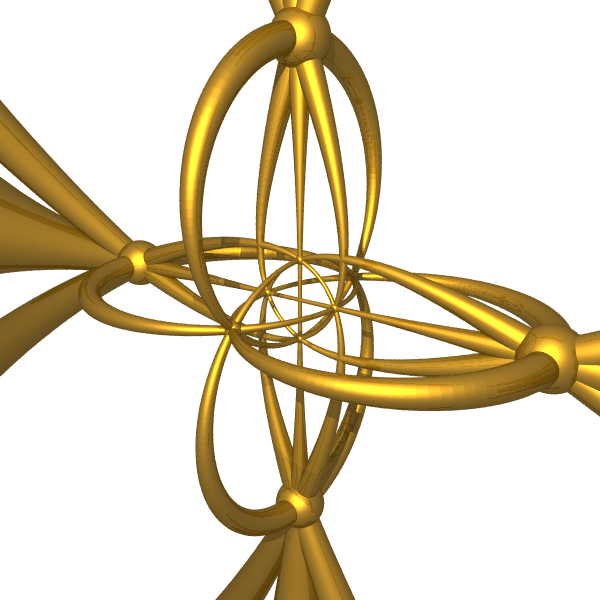
The perspective projection (3D to 2D) of a stereographic projection (4D to 3D) of the Schlegel diagram (5D to 4D) of the 5-orthoplex. 10 sets of 4 edges form 10 circles in the 4D Schlegel diagram: two of these circles are straight lines in the stereographic projection because they contain the center of projection.

== Related polytopes and honeycombs ==
2_{k1} figures in n dimensions
Space	Finite						Euclidean	Hyperbolic
n	3	4	5	6	7	8	9	10
Coxeter group	E_{3}=A_{2}A_{1}	E_{4}=A_{4}	E_{5}=D_{5}	E_{6}	E_{7}	E_{8}	E_{9} = ${\tilde{E}}_{8}$ = E_{8}^{+}	E_{10} = ${\bar{T}}_8$ = E_{8}^{++}
Coxeter diagram								
Symmetry	[3^{−1,2,1}]	[3^{0,2,1}]	[[3^{1,2,1}]]	[3^{2,2,1}]	[3^{3,2,1}]	[3^{4,2,1}]	[3^{5,2,1}]	[3^{6,2,1}]
Order	12	120	384	51,840	2,903,040	696,729,600	∞	
Graph							-	-
Name	2_{−1,1}	2_{01}	2_{11}	2_{21}	2_{31}	2_{41}	2_{51}	2_{61}

This polytope is one of 31 uniform 5-polytopes generated from the B_{5} Coxeter plane, including the regular 5-cube and 5-orthoplex.

B5 polytopes
β_{5}	t_{1}β_{5}	t_{2}γ_{5}	t_{1}γ_{5}	γ_{5}	t_{0,1}β_{5}	t_{0,2}β_{5}	t_{1,2}β_{5}
t_{0,3}β_{5}	t_{1,3}γ_{5}	t_{1,2}γ_{5}	t_{0,4}γ_{5}	t_{0,3}γ_{5}	t_{0,2}γ_{5}	t_{0,1}γ_{5}	t_{0,1,2}β_{5}
t_{0,1,3}β_{5}	t_{0,2,3}β_{5}	t_{1,2,3}γ_{5}	t_{0,1,4}β_{5}	t_{0,2,4}γ_{5}	t_{0,2,3}γ_{5}	t_{0,1,4}γ_{5}	t_{0,1,3}γ_{5}
t_{0,1,2}γ_{5}	t_{0,1,2,3}β_{5}	t_{0,1,2,4}β_{5}	t_{0,1,3,4}γ_{5}	t_{0,1,2,4}γ_{5}	t_{0,1,2,3}γ_{5}	t_{0,1,2,3,4}γ_{5}	

Fundamental convex regular and uniform polytopes in dimensions 2–10
Family	A_{n}	B_{n}	I_{2}(p) / D_{n}	E_{6} / E_{7} / E_{8} / F_{4} / G_{2}	H_{n}
Regular polygon	Triangle	Square	p-gon	Hexagon	Pentagon
Uniform polyhedron	Tetrahedron	Octahedron • Cube	Demicube		Dodecahedron • Icosahedron
Uniform polychoron	Pentachoron	16-cell • Tesseract	Demitesseract	24-cell	120-cell • 600-cell
Uniform 5-polytope	5-simplex	5-orthoplex • 5-cube	5-demicube		
Uniform 6-polytope	6-simplex	6-orthoplex • 6-cube	6-demicube	1_{22} • 2_{21}	
Uniform 7-polytope	7-simplex	7-orthoplex • 7-cube	7-demicube	1_{32} • 2_{31} • 3_{21}	
Uniform 8-polytope	8-simplex	8-orthoplex • 8-cube	8-demicube	1_{42} • 2_{41} • 4_{21}	
Uniform 9-polytope	9-simplex	9-orthoplex • 9-cube	9-demicube		
Uniform 10-polytope	10-simplex	10-orthoplex • 10-cube	10-demicube		
Uniform n-polytope	n-simplex	n-orthoplex • n-cube	n-demicube	1_{k2} • 2_{k1} • k_{21}	n-pentagonal polytope
Topics: Polytope families • Regular polytope • List of regular polytopes and compounds • Polytope operations
