= Rectified 5-orthoplexes =

5-cube	Rectified 5-cube	Birectified 5-cube Birectified 5-orthoplex
5-orthoplex	Rectified 5-orthoplex	Birectified 5-cube Birectified 5-orthoplex
Orthogonal projections in A_{5} Coxeter plane

In five-dimensional geometry, a rectified 5-orthoplex is a convex uniform 5-polytope, being a rectification of the regular 5-orthoplex.

There are 5 degrees of rectifications for any 5-polytope, the zeroth here being the 5-orthoplex itself, and the 4th and last being the 5-cube. Vertices of the rectified 5-orthoplex are located at the edge-centers of the 5-orthoplex. Vertices of the birectified 5-orthoplex are located in the triangular face centers of the 5-orthoplex.

== Rectified 5-orthoplex ==
Rectified pentacross
Type	uniform 5-polytope
Schläfli symbol	t_{1}{3,3,3,4}
Coxeter-Dynkin diagrams	
Hypercells	42 total: 10 {3,3,4} 32 t_{1}{3,3,3}
Cells	240 total: 80 {3,4} 160 {3,3}
Faces	400 total: 80+320 {3}
Edges	240
Vertices	40
Vertex figure	Octahedral prism
Petrie polygon	Decagon
Coxeter groups	BC_{5}, [3,3,3,4] D_{5}, [3^{2,1,1}]
Properties	convex

Its 40 vertices represent the root vectors of the simple Lie group D_{5}. The vertices can be seen in 3 hyperplanes, with the 10 vertices rectified 5-cells cells on opposite sides, and 20 vertices of a runcinated 5-cell passing through the center. When combined with the 10 vertices of the 5-orthoplex, these vertices represent the 50 root vectors of the B_{5} and C_{5} simple Lie groups.

E. L. Elte identified it in 1912 as a semiregular polytope, identifying it as Cr_{5}^{1} as a first rectification of a 5-dimensional cross polytope.

=== Alternate names ===
- Rectified pentacross
- Rectified triacontaditeron (32-faceted 5-polytope)
- Acronym: rat (Jonathan Bowers)

=== Construction ===
There are two Coxeter groups associated with the rectified pentacross, one with the C_{5} or [4,3,3,3] Coxeter group, and a lower symmetry with two copies of 16-cell facets, alternating, with the D_{5} or [3^{2,1,1}] Coxeter group.

== Cartesian coordinates ==
Cartesian coordinates for the vertices of a rectified pentacross, centered at the origin, edge length $\sqrt{2}\$ are all permutations of:

(±1,±1,0,0,0)

=== Images ===
Orthographic projections
Coxeter plane	B_{5}	B_{4} / D_{5}	B_{3} / D_{4} / A_{2}
Graph			
Dihedral symmetry	[10]	[8]	[6]
Coxeter plane	B_{2}	A_{3}	
Graph			
Dihedral symmetry	[4]	[4]	

== Related polytopes ==
The rectified 5-orthoplex is the vertex figure for the 5-demicube honeycomb:

or

This polytope is one of 31 uniform 5-polytopes generated from the regular 5-cube or 5-orthoplex.

B5 polytopes
β_{5}	t_{1}β_{5}	t_{2}γ_{5}	t_{1}γ_{5}	γ_{5}	t_{0,1}β_{5}	t_{0,2}β_{5}	t_{1,2}β_{5}
t_{0,3}β_{5}	t_{1,3}γ_{5}	t_{1,2}γ_{5}	t_{0,4}γ_{5}	t_{0,3}γ_{5}	t_{0,2}γ_{5}	t_{0,1}γ_{5}	t_{0,1,2}β_{5}
t_{0,1,3}β_{5}	t_{0,2,3}β_{5}	t_{1,2,3}γ_{5}	t_{0,1,4}β_{5}	t_{0,2,4}γ_{5}	t_{0,2,3}γ_{5}	t_{0,1,4}γ_{5}	t_{0,1,3}γ_{5}
t_{0,1,2}γ_{5}	t_{0,1,2,3}β_{5}	t_{0,1,2,4}β_{5}	t_{0,1,3,4}γ_{5}	t_{0,1,2,4}γ_{5}	t_{0,1,2,3}γ_{5}	t_{0,1,2,3,4}γ_{5}	

== Notes ==
Fundamental convex regular and uniform polytopes in dimensions 2–10
Family	A_{n}	B_{n}	I_{2}(p) / D_{n}	E_{6} / E_{7} / E_{8} / F_{4} / G_{2}	H_{n}
Regular polygon	Triangle	Square	p-gon	Hexagon	Pentagon
Uniform polyhedron	Tetrahedron	Octahedron • Cube	Demicube		Dodecahedron • Icosahedron
Uniform polychoron	Pentachoron	16-cell • Tesseract	Demitesseract	24-cell	120-cell • 600-cell
Uniform 5-polytope	5-simplex	5-orthoplex • 5-cube	5-demicube		
Uniform 6-polytope	6-simplex	6-orthoplex • 6-cube	6-demicube	1_{22} • 2_{21}	
Uniform 7-polytope	7-simplex	7-orthoplex • 7-cube	7-demicube	1_{32} • 2_{31} • 3_{21}	
Uniform 8-polytope	8-simplex	8-orthoplex • 8-cube	8-demicube	1_{42} • 2_{41} • 4_{21}	
Uniform 9-polytope	9-simplex	9-orthoplex • 9-cube	9-demicube		
Uniform 10-polytope	10-simplex	10-orthoplex • 10-cube	10-demicube		
Uniform n-polytope	n-simplex	n-orthoplex • n-cube	n-demicube	1_{k2} • 2_{k1} • k_{21}	n-pentagonal polytope
Topics: Polytope families • Regular polytope • List of regular polytopes and compounds • Polytope operations
