= 5-cube =

5-dimensional hypercube

5-cube Penteract (pent)
Type	uniform 5-polytope	
Schläfli symbol	{4,3,3,3}	
Coxeter diagram		
4-faces	10	tesseracts
Cells	40	cubes
Faces	80	squares
Edges	80	
Vertices	32	
Vertex figure	5-cell	
Coxeter group	B_{5}, [4,3^{3}], order 3840	
Dual	5-orthoplex	
Base point	(1,1,1,1,1,1)	
Circumradius	sqrt(5)/2 = 1.118034	
Properties	convex, isogonal regular, Hanner polytope	

In five-dimensional geometry, a 5-cube (or penteract) is a five-dimensional hypercube with 32 vertices, 80 edges, 80 square faces, 40 cubic cells, and 10 tesseract 4-faces.

It is represented by Schläfli symbol {4,3,3,3} or {4,3^{3}}, constructed as 3 tesseracts, {4,3,3}, around each cubic ridge.

== Related polytopes ==
It is a part of an infinite hypercube family. The dual of a penteract is the 5-orthoplex, of the infinite family of orthoplexes.

Applying an alternation operation, deleting alternating vertices of the 5-cube, creates another uniform 5-polytope, called a 5-demicube, which is also part of an infinite family called the demihypercubes.

The penteract can be seen as an order-3 tesseractic honeycomb on a 4-sphere. It is related to the Euclidean 4-space (order-4) tesseractic honeycomb and paracompact hyperbolic honeycomb order-5 tesseractic honeycomb.

== As a configuration ==
This configuration matrix represents the 5-cube. The rows and columns correspond to vertices, edges, faces, cells, and 4-faces. The diagonal numbers say how many of each element occur in the whole 5-cube. The nondiagonal numbers say how many of the column's element occur in or at the row's element.

$$\begin{bmatrix}\begin{matrix}
32 & 5 & 10 & 10 & 5 \\
2 & 80 & 4 & 6 & 4 \\
4 & 4 & 80 & 3 & 3 \\
8 & 12 & 6 & 40 & 2 \\
16 & 32 & 24 & 8 & 10
\end{matrix}\end{bmatrix}$$

== Cartesian coordinates ==
The Cartesian coordinates of the vertices of a 5-cube centered at the origin and having edge length 2 are

(±1,±1,±1,±1,±1),

while this 5-cube's interior consists of all points (x_{0}, x_{1}, x_{2}, x_{3}, x_{4}) with −1 < x_{i} < 1 for all i.

== Images ==
n-cube Coxeter plane projections in the B_{k} Coxeter groups project into k-cube graphs, with power of two vertices overlapping in the projective graphs.

Orthographic projections
Coxeter plane	B_{5}	B_{4} / D_{5}	B_{3} / D_{4} / A_{2}
Graph			
Dihedral symmetry	[10]	[8]	[6]
Coxeter plane	Other	B_{2}	A_{3}
Graph			
Dihedral symmetry	[2]	[4]	[4]

More orthographic projections
Wireframe skew direction	B5 Coxeter plane

Graph
Vertex-edge graph.

Perspective projections
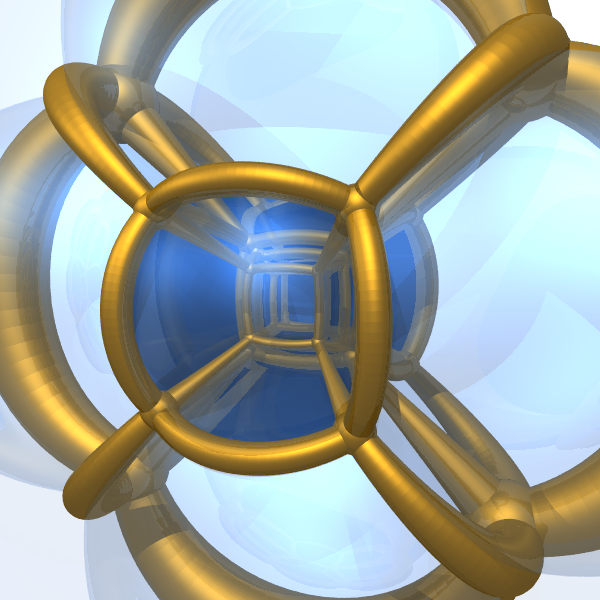
A perspective projection 3D to 2D of stereographic projection 4D to 3D of Schlegel diagram 5D to 4D.

Net
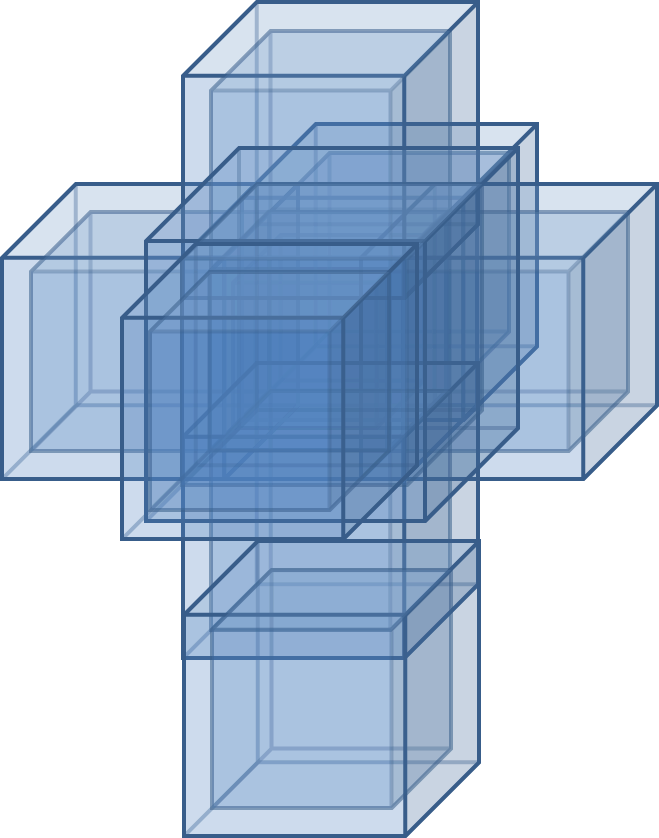
4D net of the 5-cube, perspective projected into 3D.

== Projection ==
The 5-cube can be projected down to 3 dimensions with a rhombic icosahedron envelope. There are 22 exterior vertices, and 10 interior vertices. The 10 interior vertices have the convex hull of a pentagonal antiprism. The 80 edges project into 40 external edges and 40 internal ones. The 40 cubes project into golden rhombohedra which can be used to dissect the rhombic icosahedron. The projection vectors are u = {1, φ, 0, -1, φ}, v = {φ, 0, 1, φ, 0}, w = {0, 1, φ, 0, -1}, where φ is the golden ratio, $\frac{1 + \sqrt{5}}{2}$.

Rhombic icosahedron	5-cube
Perspective	orthogonal

It is also possible to project penteracts into three-dimensional space, similarly to projecting a cube into two-dimensional space.

A 3D perspective projection of a penteract undergoing a simple rotation about the W1-W2 orthogonal plane	A 3D perspective projection of a penteract undergoing a double rotation about the X-W1 and Z-W2 orthogonal planes

== Symmetry ==
The 5-cube has Coxeter group symmetry B_{5}, abstract structure $C_{2}\wr S_{5}$, order 3840, containing 25 hyperplanes of reflection. The Schläfli symbol for the 5-cube, {4,3,3,3}, matches the Coxeter notation symmetry [4,3,3,3].

=== Prisms ===
All hypercubes have lower symmetry forms constructed as prisms. The 5-cube has 7 prismatic forms from the lowest 5-orthotope, { }^{5}, and upwards as orthogonal edges are constrained to be of equal length. The vertices in a prism are equal to the product of the vertices in the elements. The edges of a prism can be partitioned into the number of edges in an element times the number of vertices in all the other elements.

Description	Schläfli symbol	Coxeter-Dynkin diagram	Vertices	Edges	Coxeter notation Symmetry	Order
5-cube	{4,3,3,3}		32	80	[4,3,3,3]	3840
tesseractic prism	{4,3,3}×{ }		16×2 = 32	64 + 16 = 80	[4,3,3,2]	768
cube-square duoprism	{4,3}×{4}		8×4 = 32	48 + 32 = 80	[4,3,2,4]	384
cube-rectangle duoprism	{4,3}×{ }^{2}		8×2^{2} = 32	48 + 2×16 = 80	[4,3,2,2]	192
square-square duoprism prism	{4}^{2}×{ }		4^{2}×2 = 32	2×32 + 16 = 80	[4,2,4,2]	128
square-rectangular parallelepiped duoprism	{4}×{ }^{3}		4×2^{3} = 32	32 + 3×16 = 80	[4,2,2,2]	64
5-orthotope	{ }^{5}		2^{5} = 32	5×16 = 80	[2,2,2,2]	32

== Related polytopes ==
The 5-cube is 5th in a series of hypercube:

Petrie polygon orthographic projections
Line segment	Square	Cube	4-cube	5-cube	6-cube	7-cube	8-cube	9-cube	10-cube

The regular skew polyhedron {4,5| 4} can be realized within the 5-cube, with its 32 vertices, 80 edges, and 40 square faces, and the other 40 square faces of the 5-cube become square holes.

This polytope is one of 31 uniform 5-polytopes generated from the regular 5-cube or 5-orthoplex.

B5 polytopes
β_{5}	t_{1}β_{5}	t_{2}γ_{5}	t_{1}γ_{5}	γ_{5}	t_{0,1}β_{5}	t_{0,2}β_{5}	t_{1,2}β_{5}
t_{0,3}β_{5}	t_{1,3}γ_{5}	t_{1,2}γ_{5}	t_{0,4}γ_{5}	t_{0,3}γ_{5}	t_{0,2}γ_{5}	t_{0,1}γ_{5}	t_{0,1,2}β_{5}
t_{0,1,3}β_{5}	t_{0,2,3}β_{5}	t_{1,2,3}γ_{5}	t_{0,1,4}β_{5}	t_{0,2,4}γ_{5}	t_{0,2,3}γ_{5}	t_{0,1,4}γ_{5}	t_{0,1,3}γ_{5}
t_{0,1,2}γ_{5}	t_{0,1,2,3}β_{5}	t_{0,1,2,4}β_{5}	t_{0,1,3,4}γ_{5}	t_{0,1,2,4}γ_{5}	t_{0,1,2,3}γ_{5}	t_{0,1,2,3,4}γ_{5}	

Fundamental convex regular and uniform polytopes in dimensions 2–10
Family	A_{n}	B_{n}	I_{2}(p) / D_{n}	E_{6} / E_{7} / E_{8} / F_{4} / G_{2}	H_{n}
Regular polygon	Triangle	Square	p-gon	Hexagon	Pentagon
Uniform polyhedron	Tetrahedron	Octahedron • Cube	Demicube		Dodecahedron • Icosahedron
Uniform polychoron	Pentachoron	16-cell • Tesseract	Demitesseract	24-cell	120-cell • 600-cell
Uniform 5-polytope	5-simplex	5-orthoplex • 5-cube	5-demicube		
Uniform 6-polytope	6-simplex	6-orthoplex • 6-cube	6-demicube	1_{22} • 2_{21}	
Uniform 7-polytope	7-simplex	7-orthoplex • 7-cube	7-demicube	1_{32} • 2_{31} • 3_{21}	
Uniform 8-polytope	8-simplex	8-orthoplex • 8-cube	8-demicube	1_{42} • 2_{41} • 4_{21}	
Uniform 9-polytope	9-simplex	9-orthoplex • 9-cube	9-demicube		
Uniform 10-polytope	10-simplex	10-orthoplex • 10-cube	10-demicube		
Uniform n-polytope	n-simplex	n-orthoplex • n-cube	n-demicube	1_{k2} • 2_{k1} • k_{21}	n-pentagonal polytope
Topics: Polytope families • Regular polytope • List of regular polytopes and compounds • Polytope operations
