= Eight-dimensional space =

Geometric space with eight dimensions

Eight-dimensional (8D) space is a sequence of n real numbers (when n = 8) that can be understood as a location in n-dimensional space. Often such spaces are studied as vector spaces, without any notion of distance. Eight-dimensional Euclidean space is eight-dimensional space equipped with the Euclidean metric.

More generally the term may refer to an eight-dimensional vector space over any field, such as an eight-dimensional complex vector space, which has 16 real dimensions. It may also refer to an eight-dimensional manifold such as an 8-sphere, or a variety of other geometric constructions.

== Geometry ==
=== 8-polytope ===
A polytope in eight dimensions is called an 8-polytope. The most studied are the regular polytopes, of which there are only three in eight dimensions: the 8-simplex, 8-cube, and 8-orthoplex. A broader family are the uniform 8-polytopes, constructed from fundamental symmetry domains of reflection, each domain defined by a Coxeter group. Each uniform polytope is defined by a ringed Coxeter-Dynkin diagram. The 8-demicube is a unique polytope from the D_{8} family, and 4_{21}, 2_{41}, and 1_{42} polytopes from the E_{8} family.

Regular and uniform polytopes in eight dimensions (Displayed as orthogonal projections in each Coxeter plane of symmetry)
| A_{8} | B_{8} | | D_{8} |
|---|---|---|---|
| 8-simplex {3,3,3,3,3,3,3} | 8-cube {4,3,3,3,3,3,3} | 8-orthoplex {3,3,3,3,3,3,4} | 8-demicube h{4,3,3,3,3,3,3} |
E_{8}
| 4_{21} {3,3,3,3,3^{2,1}} | | 2_{41} {3,3,3^{4,1}} | 1_{42} {3,3^{4,2}} |

=== 7-sphere ===
The 7-sphere or hypersphere in eight dimensions is the seven-dimensional surface equidistant from a point, e.g. the origin. It has symbol S^{7}, with formal definition for the 7-sphere with radius r of
$$S^7 = \left\{ x \in \mathbb{R}^8 : \|x\| = r\right\}.$$

The volume of the space bounded by this 7-sphere is
$$V_8\,=\frac{\pi^4}{24}\,R^8$$
which is 4.05871 × r^{8}, or 0.01585 of the 8-cube that contains the 7-sphere.

=== Kissing number problem ===
The kissing number problem has been solved in eight dimensions, thanks to the existence of the 4_{21} polytope and its associated lattice. The kissing number in eight dimensions is 240.

== Octonions ==
The octonions are a normed division algebra over the real numbers, the largest such algebra. Mathematically they can be specified by 8-tuplets of real numbers, so form an 8-dimensional vector space over the reals, with addition of vectors being the addition in the algebra. A normed algebra is one with a product that satisfies

$$\|xy\| \leq \|x\| \|y\|$$

for all x and y in the algebra. A normed division algebra additionally must be finite-dimensional, and have the property that every non-zero vector has a unique multiplicative inverse. Hurwitz's theorem prohibits such a structure from existing in dimensions other than 1, 2, 4, or 8.

== Biquaternions ==
The complexified quaternions $\mathbb{C} \otimes \mathbb{H}$, or "biquaternions," are an eight-dimensional algebra dating to William Rowan Hamilton's work in the 1850s. This algebra is equivalent (that is, isomorphic) to the Clifford algebra $C \ell _2 (\mathbb{C})$ and the Pauli algebra. It has also been proposed as a practical or pedagogical tool for doing calculations in special relativity, and in that context goes by the name Algebra of physical space (not to be confused with the Spacetime algebra, which is 16-dimensional.)
