= Five-dimensional space =

Geometric space with five dimensions

A 2D orthogonal projection of a 5-cube

A five-dimensional (5D) space is a mathematical or physical space that has five independent dimensions. In physics and geometry, such a space extends the familiar three spatial dimensions plus time (4D spacetime) by introducing an additional degree of freedom, which is often used to model advanced theories such as higher-dimensional gravity, extra spatial directions, or connections between different points in spacetime.

== Concepts ==
Concepts related to five-dimensional spaces include super-dimensional or hyper-dimensional spaces, which generally refer to any space with more than four dimensions. These ideas appear in theoretical physics, cosmology, and science fiction to explore phenomena beyond ordinary perception.

Important related topics include:

- 5-manifold — a generalization of a surface or volume to five dimensions.
- 5-cube — also called a penteract, a specific five-dimensional hypercube.
- Hypersphere — the generalization of a sphere to higher dimensions, including five-dimensional space.
- List of regular 5-polytopes — regular geometric shapes that exist in five-dimensional space.
- Four-dimensional space — a foundational step to understanding five-dimensional extensions.

== Five-dimensional Euclidean geometry ==
5D Euclidean geometry, designated E^{5}, is dimensions beyond two (planar) and three (solid). Shapes studied in five dimensions include counterparts of regular polyhedra and of the sphere.

=== Polytopes ===
In five or more dimensions, only three regular polytopes exist. In five dimensions, they are:

- The 5-simplex of the simplex family, {3,3,3,3}, with 6 vertices, 15 edges, 20 faces (each an equilateral triangle), 15 cells (each a regular tetrahedron), and 6 hypercells (each a 5-cell).
- The 5-cube of the hypercube family, {4,3,3,3}, with 32 vertices, 80 edges, 80 faces (each a square), 40 cells (each a cube), and 10 hypercells (each a tesseract).
- The 5-orthoplex of the cross polytope family, {3,3,3,4}, with 10 vertices, 40 edges, 80 faces (each a triangle), 80 cells (each a tetrahedron), and 32 hypercells (each a 5-cell).

An important uniform 5-polytope is the 5-demicube, h{4,3,3,3} has half the vertices of the 5-cube (16), bounded by alternating 5-cell and 16-cell hypercells. The expanded or stericated 5-simplex is the vertex figure of the A_{5} lattice,. It and has a doubled symmetry from its symmetric Coxeter diagram. The kissing number of the lattice, 30, is represented in its vertices. The rectified 5-orthoplex is the vertex figure of the D_{5} lattice,. Its 40 vertices represent the kissing number of the lattice and the highest for dimension 5.

Regular and semiregular polytopes in five dimensions (Displayed as orthogonal projections in each Coxeter plane of symmetry)
| A_{5} | Aut(A_{5}) | B_{5} | | | D_{5} |
|---|---|---|---|---|---|
| 5-simplex {3,3,3,3} | Stericated 5-simplex | 5-cube {4,3,3,3} | 5-orthoplex {3,3,3,4} | Rectified 5-orthoplex r{3,3,3,4} | 5-demicube h{4,3,3,3} |

== Other five-dimensional geometries ==
The theory of special relativity makes use of Minkowski spacetime, a type of geometry that locates events in both space and time. The time dimension is mathematically distinguished from the spatial dimensions by a modification in the formula for computing the "distance" between events. Ordinary Minkowski spacetime has four dimensions in all, three of space and one of time. However, higher-dimensional generalizations of the concept have been employed in various proposals. Kaluza–Klein theory, a speculative attempt to develop a unified theory of gravity and electromagnetism, relied upon a spacetime with four dimensions of space and one of time.

Geometries can also be constructed in which the coordinates are something other than real numbers. For example, one can define a space in which the points are labeled by tuples of 5 complex numbers. This is often denoted $\mathbb{C}^5$. In quantum information theory, quantum systems described by quantum states belonging to $\mathbb{C}^5$ are sometimes called ququints.

== See also ==
- 5-manifold
- Four-dimensional space
- Gravity
- Hypersphere
- List of regular 5-polytopes
