= 1 42 polytope =

Uniform 8 dimensional polytope

4_{21}	1_{42}	2_{41}
Rectified 4_{21}	Rectified 1_{42}	Rectified 2_{41}
Birectified 4_{21}	Trirectified 4_{21}	
Orthogonal projections in E_{6} Coxeter plane

In 8-dimensional geometry, the 1_{42} is a uniform 8-polytope, constructed within the symmetry of the E_{8} group.

Its Coxeter symbol is 1_{42}, describing its bifurcating Coxeter-Dynkin diagram, with a single ring on the end of the 1-node sequences.

The rectified 1_{42} is constructed by points at the mid-edges of the 1_{42} and is the same as the birectified 2_{41}, and the quadrirectified 4_{21}.

These polytopes are part of a family of 255 (2^{8} − 1) convex uniform polytopes in 8 dimensions, made of uniform polytope facets and vertex figures, defined by all non-empty combinations of rings in this Coxeter-Dynkin diagram:.

== 1_{42} polytope ==
1_{42}
Type	Uniform 8-polytope
Family	1_{k2} polytope
Schläfli symbol	{3,3^{4,2}}
Coxeter symbol	1_{42}
Coxeter diagrams	
7-faces	2400: 240 1_{32} 2160 1_{41}
6-faces	106080: 6720 1_{22} 30240 1_{31} 69120 {3^{5}}
5-faces	725760: 60480 1_{12} 181440 1_{21} 483840 {3^{4}}
4-faces	2298240: 241920 1_{02} 604800 1_{11} 1451520 {3^{3}}
Cells	3628800: 1209600 1_{01} 2419200 {3^{2}}
Faces	2419200 {3}
Edges	483840
Vertices	17280
Vertex figure	t_{2}{3^{6}}
Petrie polygon	30-gon
Coxeter group	E_{8}, [3^{4,2,1}]
Properties	convex

The 1_{42} is composed of 2400 facets: 240 1_{32} polytopes, and 2160 7-demicubes (1_{41}). Its vertex figure is a birectified 7-simplex.

This polytope, along with the demiocteract, can tessellate 8-dimensional space, represented by the symbol 1_{52}, and Coxeter-Dynkin diagram:.

=== Alternate names ===
- E. L. Elte (1912) excluded this polytope from his listing of semiregular polytopes, because it has more than two types of 6-faces, but under his naming scheme it would be called V_{17280} for its 17280 vertices.
- Coxeter named it 1_{42} for its bifurcating Coxeter-Dynkin diagram, with a single ring on the end of the 1-node branch.
- Diacositetraconta-dischiliahectohexaconta-zetton (acronym: bif) – 240-2160 facetted polyzetton (Jonathan Bowers)

=== Coordinates ===
The 17280 vertices can be defined as sign and location permutations of:

All sign combinations (32): (280 × 32 = 8960 vertices)

(4, 2, 2, 2, 2, 0, 0, 0)

Half of the sign combinations (128): ((1 + 8 + 56) × 128 = 8320 vertices)

(2, 2, 2, 2, 2, 2, 2, 2)
(5, 1, 1, 1, 1, 1, 1, 1)
(3, 3, 3, 1, 1, 1, 1, 1)

The edge length is 2√2 in this coordinate set, and the polytope radius is 4√2.

=== Construction ===
It is created by a Wythoff construction upon a set of 8 hyperplane mirrors in 8-dimensional space.

The facet information can be extracted from its Coxeter-Dynkin diagram:.

Removing the node on the end of the 2-length branch leaves the 7-demicube, 1_{41},.

Removing the node on the end of the 4-length branch leaves the 1_{32},.

The vertex figure is determined by removing the ringed node and ringing the neighboring node. This makes the birectified 7-simplex, 0_{42},.

Seen in a configuration matrix, the element counts can be derived by mirror removal and ratios of Coxeter group orders.

	Configuration matrix																				
E_{8}		k-face	f_{k}	f_{0}	f_{1}	f_{2}	f_{3}		f_{4}			f_{5}			f_{6}			f_{7}		k-figure	Notes
A_{7}		( )	f_{0}	17280	56	420	280	560	70	280	420	56	168	168	28	56	28	8	8	2r{3^{6}}	E_{8}/A_{7} = 192·10!/8! = 17280
A_{4}A_{2}A_{1}		{ }	f_{1}	2	483840	15	15	30	5	30	30	10	30	15	10	15	3	5	3	{3}x{3,3,3}	E_{8}/A_{4}A_{2}A_{1} = 192·10!/5!/2/2 = 483840
A_{3}A_{2}A_{1}		{3}	f_{2}	3	3	2419200	2	4	1	8	6	4	12	4	6	8	1	4	2	{3.3}v{ }	E_{8}/A_{3}A_{2}A_{1} = 192·10!/4!/3!/2 = 2419200
A_{3}A_{3}		1_{10}	f_{3}	4	6	4	1209600	*	1	4	0	4	6	0	6	4	0	4	1	{3,3}v( )	E_{8}/A_{3}A_{3} = 192·10!/4!/4! = 1209600
A_{3}A_{2}A_{1}		1_{10}	f_{3}	4	6	4	*	2419200	0	2	3	1	6	3	3	6	1	3	2	{3}v{ }	E_{8}/A_{3}A_{2}A_{1} = 192·10!/4!/3!/2 = 2419200
A_{4}A_{3}		1_{20}	f_{4}	5	10	10	5	0	241920	*	*	4	0	0	6	0	0	4	0	{3,3}	E_{8}/A_{4}A_{3} = 192·10!/4!/4! = 241920
D_{4}A_{2}		1_{11}	f_{4}	8	24	32	8	8	*	604800	*	1	3	0	3	3	0	3	1	{3}v( )	E_{8}/D_{4}A_{2} = 192·10!/8/4!/3! = 604800
A_{4}A_{1}A_{1}		1_{20}	f_{4}	5	10	10	0	5	*	*	1451520	0	2	2	1	4	1	2	2	{ }v{ }	E_{8}/A_{4}A_{1}A_{1} = 192·10!/5!/2/2 = 1451520
D_{5}A_{2}		1_{21}	f_{5}	16	80	160	80	40	16	10	0	60480	*	*	3	0	0	3	0	{3}	E_{8}/D_{5}A_{2} = 192·10!/16/5!/3! = 40480
D_{5}A_{1}		1_{21}	f_{5}	16	80	160	40	80	0	10	16	*	181440	*	1	2	0	2	1	{ }v( )	E_{8}/D_{5}A_{1} = 192·10!/16/5!/2 = 181440
A_{5}A_{1}		1_{30}	f_{5}	6	15	20	0	15	0	0	6	*	*	483840	0	2	1	1	2	{ }v( )	E_{8}/A_{5}A_{1} = 192·10!/6!/2 = 483840
E_{6}A_{1}		1_{22}	f_{6}	72	720	2160	1080	1080	216	270	216	27	27	0	6720	*	*	2	0	{ }	E_{8}/E_{6}A_{1} = 192·10!/72/6!/2 = 6720
D_{6}		1_{31}	f_{6}	32	240	640	160	480	0	60	192	0	12	32	*	30240	*	1	1	{ }	E_{8}/D_{6} = 192·10!/32/6! = 30240
A_{6}A_{1}		1_{40}	f_{6}	7	21	35	0	35	0	0	21	0	0	7	*	*	69120	0	2	{ }	E_{8}/A_{6}A_{1} = 192·10!/7!/2 = 69120
E_{7}		1_{32}	f_{7}	576	10080	40320	20160	30240	4032	7560	12096	756	1512	2016	56	126	0	240	*	( )	E_{8}/E_{7} = 192·10!/72/8! = 240
D_{7}		1_{41}	f_{7}	64	672	2240	560	2240	0	280	1344	0	84	448	0	14	64	*	2160	( )	E_{8}/D_{7} = 192·10!/64/7! = 2160

=== Projections ===
E8 [30]	E7 [18]	E6 [12]
(1)	(1,3,6)	(8,16,24,32,48,64,96)
[20]	[24]	[6]
		(1,2,3,4,5,6,7,8,10,11,12,14,16,18,19,20)

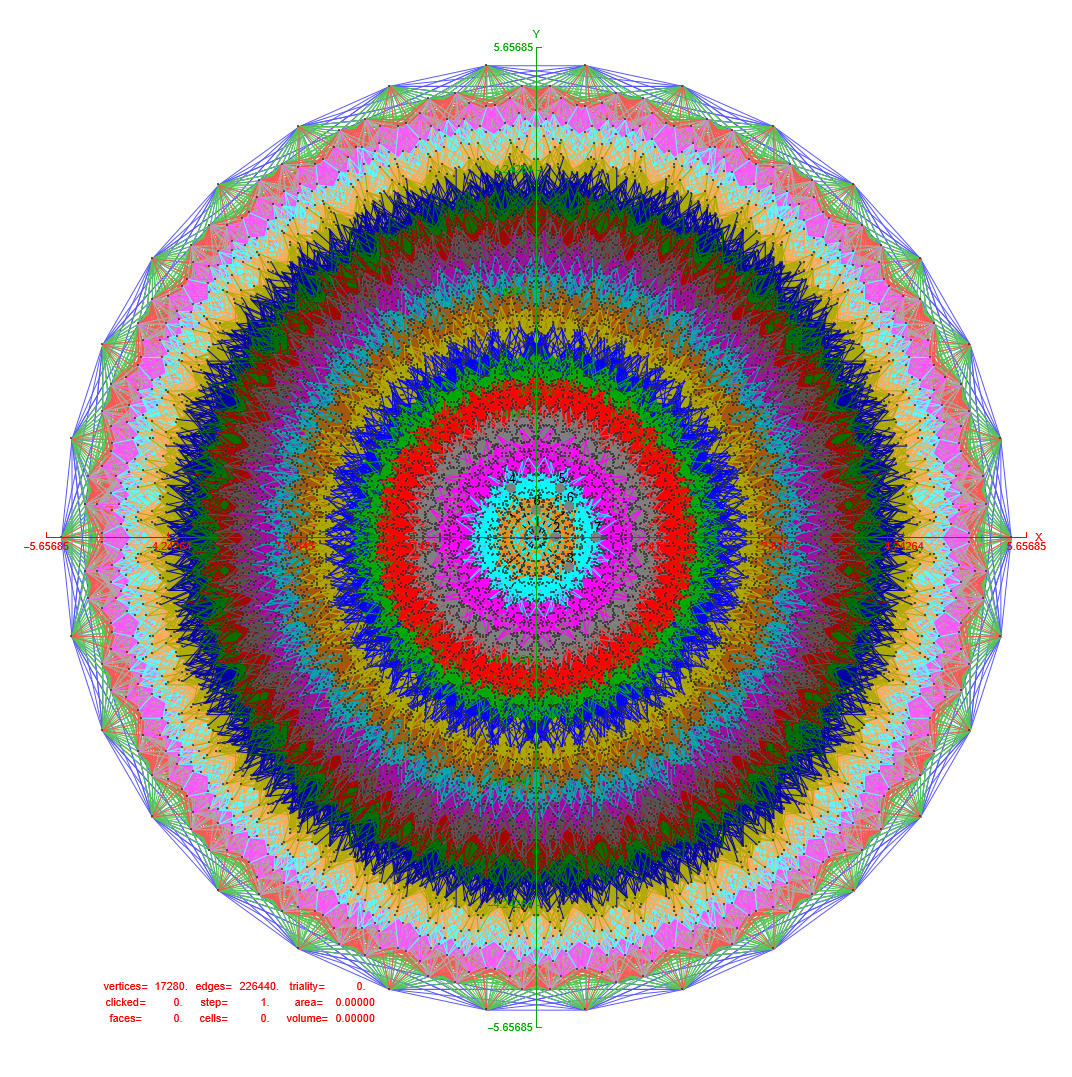
The projection of 1_{42} to the E_{8} Coxeter plane (also known as the Petrie projection) with polytope radius $4\sqrt{2}$ is shown below with 483,840 edges of length $2\sqrt{2}$ culled 53% on the interior to only 226,440.

Orthographic projections are shown for the sub-symmetries of E_{8}: E_{7}, E_{6}, B_{8}, B_{7}, B_{6}, B_{5}, B_{4}, B_{3}, B_{2}, A_{7}, and A_{5} Coxeter planes, as well as two more symmetry planes of order 20 and 24. Vertices are shown as circles, colored by their number of overlap in each projective plane in increasing order: red, orange, yellow, green, cyan, blue, purple, magenta, red-violet.

D3 / B2 / A3 [4]	D4 / B3 / A2 [6]	D5 / B4 [8]
(32,160,192,240,480,512,832,960)	(72,216,432,720,864,1080)	(8,16,24,32,48,64,96)
D6 / B5 / A4 [10]	D7 / B6 [12]	D8 / B7 / A6 [14]
B8 [16/2]	A5 [6]	A7 [8]

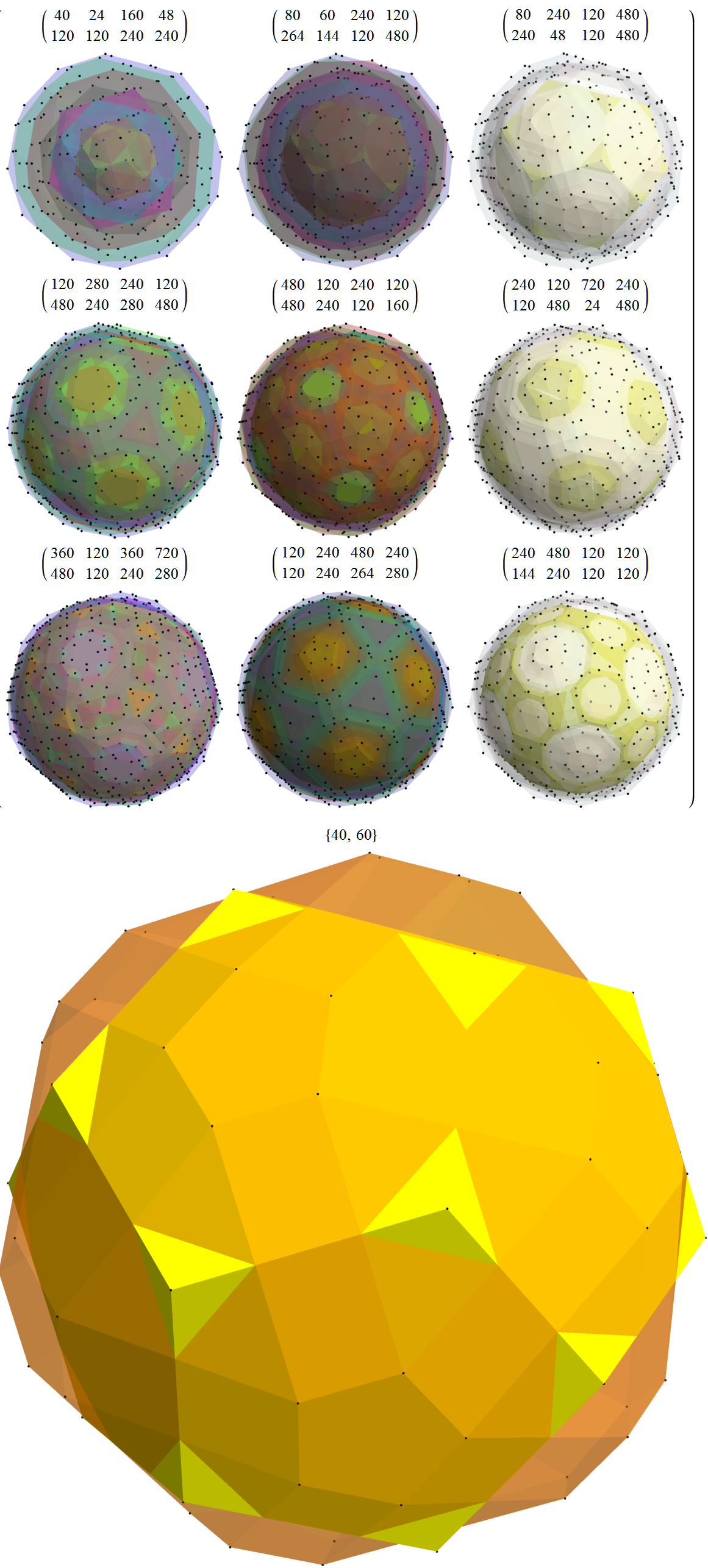
Shown in 3D projection using the basis vectors [u,v,w] giving H3 symmetry: u = (1, φ, 0, −1, φ, 0, 0, 0); v = (φ, 0, 1, φ, 0, −1, 0, 0); w = (0, 1, φ, 0, −1, φ, 0, 0); The 17280 projected 1_{42} polytope vertices are sorted and tallied by their 3D norm generating the increasingly transparent hulls for each set of tallied norms. Notice the last two outer hulls are a combination of two overlapped dodecahedrons (40) and a nonuniform rhombicosidodecahedron (60).

=== Related polytopes and honeycombs ===
1_{k2} figures in n dimensions
Space	Finite						Euclidean	Hyperbolic
n	3	4	5	6	7	8	9	10
Coxeter group	E_{3}=A_{2}A_{1}	E_{4}=A_{4}	E_{5}=D_{5}	E_{6}	E_{7}	E_{8}	E_{9} = ${\tilde{E}}_{8}$ = E_{8}^{+}	E_{10} = ${\bar{T}}_8$ = E_{8}^{++}
Coxeter diagram								
Symmetry (order)	[3^{−1,2,1}]	[3^{0,2,1}]	[3^{1,2,1}]	[[3^{2,2,1}]]	[3^{3,2,1}]	[3^{4,2,1}]	[3^{5,2,1}]	[3^{6,2,1}]
Order	12	120	1,920	103,680	2,903,040	696,729,600	∞	
Graph							-	-
Name	1_{−1,2}	1_{02}	1_{12}	1_{22}	1_{32}	1_{42}	1_{52}	1_{62}

== Rectified 1_{42} polytope ==
Rectified 1_{42}
Type	Uniform 8-polytope
Schläfli symbol	t_{1}{3,3^{4,2}}
Coxeter symbol	0_{421}
Coxeter diagrams	
7-faces	19680
6-faces	382560
5-faces	2661120
4-faces	9072000
Cells	16934400
Faces	16934400
Edges	7257600
Vertices	483840
Vertex figure	{3,3,3}×{3}×{}
Coxeter group	E_{8}, [3^{4,2,1}]
Properties	convex

The rectified 1_{42} is named from being a rectification of the 1_{42} polytope, with vertices positioned at the mid-edges of the 1_{42}. It can also be called a 0_{421} polytope with the ring at the center of 3 branches of length 4, 2, and 1.

=== Alternate names ===
- 0_{421} polytope
- Birectified 2_{41} polytope
- Quadrirectified 4_{21} polytope
- Rectified diacositetraconta-dischiliahectohexaconta-zetton as a rectified 240-2160 facetted polyzetton (acronym: buffy) (Jonathan Bowers)

=== Construction ===
It is created by a Wythoff construction upon a set of 8 hyperplane mirrors in 8-dimensional space.

The facet information can be extracted from its Coxeter-Dynkin diagram:.

Removing the node on the end of the 1-length branch leaves the birectified 7-simplex,

Removing the node on the end of the 2-length branch leaves the birectified 7-cube,.

Removing the node on the end of the 3-length branch leaves the rectified 1_{32},.

The vertex figure is determined by removing the ringed node and ringing the neighboring node. This makes the 5-cell-triangle duoprism prism,.

Seen in a configuration matrix, the element counts can be derived by mirror removal and ratios of Coxeter group orders.

	Configuration matrix																																	
E_{8}		k-face	f_{k}	f_{0}	f_{1}	f_{2}			f_{3}					f_{4}						f_{5}						f_{6}					f_{7}			k-figure
A_{4}A_{2}A_{1}		( )	f_{0}	483840	30	30	15	60	10	15	60	30	60	5	20	30	60	30	30	10	20	30	30	15	6	10	10	15	6	3	5	2	3	{3,3,3}x{3,3}x{}
A_{3}A_{1}A_{1}		{ }	f_{1}	2	7257600	2	1	4	1	2	8	4	6	1	4	8	12	6	4	4	6	12	8	4	1	6	4	8	2	1	4	1	2	
A_{3}A_{2}		{3}	f_{2}	3	3	4838400	*	*	1	1	4	0	0	1	4	4	6	0	0	4	6	6	4	0	0	6	4	4	1	0	4	1	1	
A_{3}A_{2}A_{1}		{3}	f_{2}	3	3	*	2419200	*	0	2	0	4	0	1	0	8	0	6	0	4	0	12	0	4	0	6	0	8	0	1	4	0	2	
A_{2}A_{2}A_{1}		{3}	f_{2}	3	3	*	*	9676800	0	0	2	1	3	0	1	2	6	3	3	1	3	6	6	3	1	3	3	6	2	1	3	1	2	
A_{3}A_{3}		0_{200}	f_{3}	4	6	4	0	0	1209600	*	*	*	*	1	4	0	0	0	0	4	6	0	0	0	0	6	4	0	0	0	4	1	0	
A_{3}A_{3}		0_{110}	f_{3}	6	12	4	4	0	*	1209600	*	*	*	1	0	4	0	0	0	4	0	6	0	0	0	6	0	4	0	0	4	0	1	
A_{3}A_{2}		0_{110}	f_{3}	6	12	4	0	4	*	*	4838400	*	*	0	1	1	3	0	0	1	3	3	3	0	0	3	3	3	1	0	3	1	1	
A_{3}A_{2}A_{1}		0_{110}	f_{3}	6	12	0	4	4	*	*	*	2419200	*	0	0	2	0	3	0	1	0	6	0	3	0	3	0	6	0	1	3	0	2	
A_{3}A_{1}A_{1}		0_{200}	f_{3}	4	6	0	0	4	*	*	*	*	7257600	0	0	0	2	1	2	0	1	2	4	2	1	1	2	4	2	1	2	1	2	
A_{4}A_{3}		0_{210}	f_{4}	10	30	20	10	0	5	5	0	0	0	241920	*	*	*	*	*	4	0	0	0	0	0	6	0	0	0	0	4	0	0	
A_{4}A_{2}		0_{210}	f_{4}	10	30	20	0	10	5	0	5	0	0	*	967680	*	*	*	*	1	3	0	0	0	0	3	3	0	0	0	3	1	0	
D_{4}A_{2}		0_{111}	f_{4}	24	96	32	32	32	0	8	8	8	0	*	*	604800	*	*	*	1	0	3	0	0	0	3	0	3	0	0	3	0	1	
A_{4}A_{1}		0_{210}	f_{4}	10	30	10	0	20	0	0	5	0	5	*	*	*	2903040	*	*	0	1	1	2	0	0	1	2	2	1	0	2	1	1	
A_{4}A_{1}A_{1}		0_{210}	f_{4}	10	30	0	10	20	0	0	0	5	5	*	*	*	*	1451520	*	0	0	2	0	2	0	1	0	4	0	1	2	0	2	
A_{4}A_{1}		0_{300}	f_{4}	5	10	0	0	10	0	0	0	0	5	*	*	*	*	*	2903040	0	0	0	2	1	1	0	1	2	2	1	1	1	2	
D_{5}A_{2}		0_{211}	f_{5}	80	480	320	160	160	80	80	80	40	0	16	16	10	0	0	0	60480	*	*	*	*	*	3	0	0	0	0	3	0	0	{3}
A_{5}A_{1}		0_{220}	f_{5}	20	90	60	0	60	15	0	30	0	15	0	6	0	6	0	0	*	483840	*	*	*	*	1	2	0	0	0	2	1	0	{ }v()
D_{5}A_{1}		0_{211}	f_{5}	80	480	160	160	320	0	40	80	80	80	0	0	10	16	16	0	*	*	181440	*	*	*	1	0	2	0	0	2	0	1	{ }v()
A_{5}		0_{310}	f_{5}	15	60	20	0	60	0	0	15	0	30	0	0	0	6	0	6	*	*	*	967680	*	*	0	1	1	1	0	1	1	1	( )v( )v()
A_{5}A_{1}		0_{310}	f_{5}	15	60	0	20	60	0	0	0	15	30	0	0	0	0	6	6	*	*	*	*	483840	*	0	0	2	0	1	1	0	2	{ }v()
A_{5}A_{1}		0_{400}	f_{5}	6	15	0	0	20	0	0	0	0	15	0	0	0	0	0	6	*	*	*	*	*	483840	0	0	0	2	1	0	1	2	{ }v()
E_{6}A_{1}		0_{221}	f_{6}	720	6480	4320	2160	4320	1080	1080	2160	1080	1080	216	432	270	432	216	0	27	72	27	0	0	0	6720	*	*	*	*	2	0	0	{ }
A_{6}		0_{320}	f_{6}	35	210	140	0	210	35	0	105	0	105	0	21	0	42	0	21	0	7	0	7	0	0	*	138240	*	*	*	1	1	0	{ }
D_{6}		0_{311}	f_{6}	240	1920	640	640	1920	0	160	480	480	960	0	0	60	192	192	192	0	0	12	32	32	0	*	*	30240	*	*	1	0	1	{ }
A_{6}		0_{410}	f_{6}	21	105	35	0	140	0	0	35	0	105	0	0	0	21	0	42	0	0	0	7	0	7	*	*	*	138240	*	0	1	1	{ }
A_{6}A_{1}		0_{410}	f_{6}	21	105	0	35	140	0	0	0	35	105	0	0	0	0	21	42	0	0	0	0	7	7	*	*	*	*	69120	0	0	2	{ }
E_{7}		0_{321}	f_{7}	10080	120960	80640	40320	120960	20160	20160	60480	30240	60480	4032	12096	7560	24192	12096	12096	756	4032	1512	4032	2016	0	56	576	126	0	0	240	*	*	( )
A_{7}		0_{420}	f_{7}	56	420	280	0	560	70	0	280	0	420	0	56	0	168	0	168	0	28	0	56	0	28	0	8	0	8	0	*	17280	*	( )
D_{7}		0_{411}	f_{7}	672	6720	2240	2240	8960	0	560	2240	2240	6720	0	0	280	1344	1344	2688	0	0	84	448	448	448	0	0	14	64	64	*	*	2160	( )

=== Projections ===
Orthographic projections are shown for the sub-symmetries of B_{6}, B_{5}, B_{4}, B_{3}, B_{2}, A_{7}, and A_{5} Coxeter planes. Vertices are shown as circles, colored by their number of overlap in each projective plane in increasing order: red, orange, yellow, green, cyan, blue, purple, magenta, red-violet.

(Planes for E_{8}: E_{7}, E_{6}, B_{8}, B_{7}, [24] are not shown for being too large to display, but projections in E_{7} and E_{6} Coxeter planes can be seen at E8 polytope § Graphs and E_{6} in the main table above.)

D3 / B2 / A3 [4]	D4 / B3 / A2 [6]	D5 / B4 [8]
D6 / B5 / A4 [10]	D7 / B6 [12]	[6]
A5 [6]	A7 [8]	[20]

== See also ==
- List of E8 polytopes

== Notes ==
Fundamental convex regular and uniform polytopes in dimensions 2–10
Family	A_{n}	B_{n}	I_{2}(p) / D_{n}	E_{6} / E_{7} / E_{8} / F_{4} / G_{2}	H_{n}
Regular polygon	Triangle	Square	p-gon	Hexagon	Pentagon
Uniform polyhedron	Tetrahedron	Octahedron • Cube	Demicube		Dodecahedron • Icosahedron
Uniform polychoron	Pentachoron	16-cell • Tesseract	Demitesseract	24-cell	120-cell • 600-cell
Uniform 5-polytope	5-simplex	5-orthoplex • 5-cube	5-demicube		
Uniform 6-polytope	6-simplex	6-orthoplex • 6-cube	6-demicube	1_{22} • 2_{21}	
Uniform 7-polytope	7-simplex	7-orthoplex • 7-cube	7-demicube	1_{32} • 2_{31} • 3_{21}	
Uniform 8-polytope	8-simplex	8-orthoplex • 8-cube	8-demicube	1_{42} • 2_{41} • 4_{21}	
Uniform 9-polytope	9-simplex	9-orthoplex • 9-cube	9-demicube		
Uniform 10-polytope	10-simplex	10-orthoplex • 10-cube	10-demicube		
Uniform n-polytope	n-simplex	n-orthoplex • n-cube	n-demicube	1_{k2} • 2_{k1} • k_{21}	n-pentagonal polytope
Topics: Polytope families • Regular polytope • List of regular polytopes and compounds • Polytope operations
