= 5-demicube =

Regular 5-polytope

Demipenteract (5-demicube)
Petrie polygon projection
Type	Uniform 5-polytope	
Family (D_{n})	5-demicube	
Families (E_{n})	k_{21} polytope 1_{k2} polytope	
Coxeter symbol	1_{21}	
Schläfli symbols	{3,3^{2,1}} = h{4,3^{3}} s{2,4,3,3} or h{2}h{4,3,3} sr{2,2,4,3} or h{2}h{2}h{4,3} h{2}h{2}h{2}h{4} s{2^{1,1,1,1}} or h{2}h{2}h{2}s{2}	
Coxeter diagrams	=	
4-faces	26	10 {3^{1,1,1}} 16 {3,3,3}
Cells	120	40 {3^{1,0,1}} 80 {3,3}
Faces	160	{3}
Edges	80	
Vertices	16	
Vertex figure	Rectified 5-cell	
Petrie polygon	Octagon	
Symmetry	D_{5}, [3^{2,1,1}] = [1^{+},4,3^{3}] [2^{4}]^{+}	
Properties	convex	

In five-dimensional geometry, a demipenteract or 5-demicube is a semiregular 5-polytope, constructed from a 5-hypercube (penteract) with alternated vertices removed.

It was discovered by Thorold Gosset. Since it was the only semiregular 5-polytope (made of more than one type of regular facets), he called it a 5-ic semi-regular. E. L. Elte identified it in 1912 as a semiregular polytope, labeling it as HM_{5} for a 5-dimensional half measure polytope.

Coxeter named this polytope as 1_{21} from its Coxeter diagram, which has branches of length 2, 1 and 1 with a ringed node on one of the short branches, and Schläfli symbol $\left\{3 \begin{array}{l}3, 3\\3\end{array}\right\}$ or {3,3^{2,1}}.

It exists in the k_{21} polytope family as 1_{21} with the Gosset polytopes: 2_{21}, 3_{21}, and 4_{21}.

The graph formed by the vertices and edges of the demipenteract is sometimes called the Clebsch graph, though that name sometimes refers to the folded cube graph of order five instead.

== Cartesian coordinates ==
Cartesian coordinates for the vertices of a demipenteract centered at the origin and edge length 2√2 are alternate halves of the penteract:

(±1,±1,±1,±1,±1)

with an odd number of plus signs.

== As a configuration ==
This configuration matrix represents the 5-demicube. The rows and columns correspond to vertices, edges, faces, cells and 4-faces. The diagonal numbers say how many of each element occur in the whole 5-demicube. The nondiagonal numbers say how many of the column's element occur in or at the row's element.

The diagonal f-vector numbers are derived through the Wythoff construction, dividing the full group order of a subgroup order by removing one mirror at a time.

D_{5}	k-face	f_{k}	f_{0}	f_{1}	f_{2}	f_{3}		f_{4}		k-figure	Notes(*)
A_{4}	( )	f_{0}	16	10	30	10	20	5	5	rectified 5-cell	D_{5}/A_{4} = 16·5!/5! = 16
A_{2}A_{1}A_{1}	{ }	f_{1}	2	80	6	3	6	3	2	triangular prism	D_{5}/A_{2}A_{1}A_{1} = 16·5!/3!/2/2 = 80
A_{2}A_{1}	{3}	f_{2}	3	3	160	1	2	2	1	Isosceles triangle	D_{5}/A_{2}A_{1} = 16·5!/3!/2 = 160
A_{3}A_{1}	h{4,3}	f_{3}	4	6	4	40	*	2	0	Segment { }	D_{5}/A_{3}A_{1} = 16·5!/4!/2 = 40
A_{3}	{3,3}	f_{3}	4	6	4	*	80	1	1	Segment { }	D_{5}/A_{3} = 16·5!/4! = 80
D_{4}	h{4,3,3}	f_{4}	8	24	32	8	8	10	*	Point ( )	D_{5}/D_{4} = 16·5!/8/4! = 10
A_{4}	{3,3,3}	f_{4}	5	10	10	0	5	*	16	Point ( )	D_{5}/A_{4} = 16·5!/5! = 16

* = The number of elements (diagonal values) can be computed by the symmetry order D_{5} divided by the symmetry order of the subgroup with selected mirrors removed.

== Projected images ==
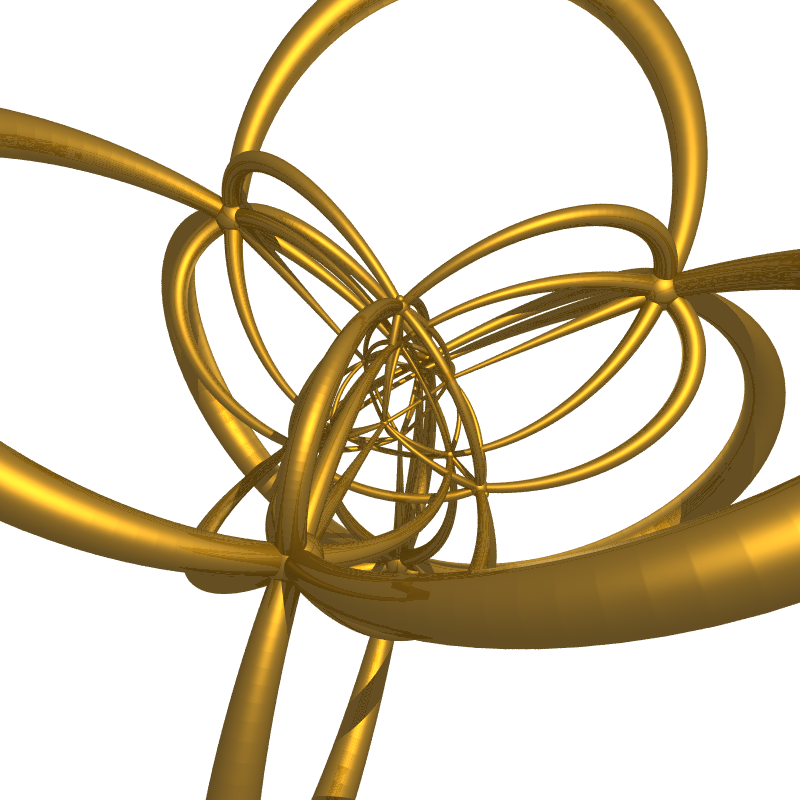
Perspective projection.

== Images ==
Orthographic projections
Coxeter plane	B_{5}	
Graph		
Dihedral symmetry	[10/2]	
Coxeter plane	D_{5}	D_{4}
Graph		
Dihedral symmetry	[8]	[6]
Coxeter plane	D_{3}	A_{3}
Graph		
Dihedral symmetry	[4]	[4]

== Related polytopes ==
It is a part of a dimensional family of uniform polytopes called demihypercubes for being alternation of the hypercube family.

There are 23 uniform 5-polytopes that can be constructed from the D_{5} symmetry of the demipenteract, 8 of which are unique to this family, and 15 are shared within the penteractic family.

D5 polytopes
h{4,3,3,3}	h_{2}{4,3,3,3}	h_{3}{4,3,3,3}	h_{4}{4,3,3,3}	h_{2,3}{4,3,3,3}	h_{2,4}{4,3,3,3}	h_{3,4}{4,3,3,3}	h_{2,3,4}{4,3,3,3}

The 5-demicube is third in a dimensional series of semiregular polytopes. Each progressive uniform polytope is constructed vertex figure of the previous polytope. Thorold Gosset identified this series in 1900 as containing all regular polytope facets, containing all simplexes and orthoplexes (5-simplices and 5-orthoplexes in the case of the 5-demicube). In Coxeter's notation the 5-demicube is given the symbol 1_{21}.

k_{21} figures in n dimensions
Space	Finite						Euclidean	Hyperbolic
E_{n}	3	4	5	6	7	8	9	10
Coxeter group	E_{3}=A_{2}A_{1}	E_{4}=A_{4}	E_{5}=D_{5}	E_{6}	E_{7}	E_{8}	E_{9} = ${\tilde{E}}_{8}$ = E_{8}^{+}	E_{10} = ${\bar{T}}_8$ = E_{8}^{++}
Coxeter diagram								
Symmetry	[3^{−1,2,1}]	[3^{0,2,1}]	[3^{1,2,1}]	[3^{2,2,1}]	[3^{3,2,1}]	[3^{4,2,1}]	[3^{5,2,1}]	[3^{6,2,1}]
Order	12	120	1,920	51,840	2,903,040	696,729,600	∞	
Graph							-	-
Name	−1_{21}	0_{21}	1_{21}	2_{21}	3_{21}	4_{21}	5_{21}	6_{21}

1_{k2} figures in n dimensions
Space	Finite						Euclidean	Hyperbolic
n	3	4	5	6	7	8	9	10
Coxeter group	E_{3}=A_{2}A_{1}	E_{4}=A_{4}	E_{5}=D_{5}	E_{6}	E_{7}	E_{8}	E_{9} = ${\tilde{E}}_{8}$ = E_{8}^{+}	E_{10} = ${\bar{T}}_8$ = E_{8}^{++}
Coxeter diagram								
Symmetry (order)	[3^{−1,2,1}]	[3^{0,2,1}]	[3^{1,2,1}]	[[3^{2,2,1}]]	[3^{3,2,1}]	[3^{4,2,1}]	[3^{5,2,1}]	[3^{6,2,1}]
Order	12	120	1,920	103,680	2,903,040	696,729,600	∞	
Graph							-	-
Name	1_{−1,2}	1_{02}	1_{12}	1_{22}	1_{32}	1_{42}	1_{52}	1_{62}

Fundamental convex regular and uniform polytopes in dimensions 2–10
Family	A_{n}	B_{n}	I_{2}(p) / D_{n}	E_{6} / E_{7} / E_{8} / F_{4} / G_{2}	H_{n}
Regular polygon	Triangle	Square	p-gon	Hexagon	Pentagon
Uniform polyhedron	Tetrahedron	Octahedron • Cube	Demicube		Dodecahedron • Icosahedron
Uniform polychoron	Pentachoron	16-cell • Tesseract	Demitesseract	24-cell	120-cell • 600-cell
Uniform 5-polytope	5-simplex	5-orthoplex • 5-cube	5-demicube		
Uniform 6-polytope	6-simplex	6-orthoplex • 6-cube	6-demicube	1_{22} • 2_{21}	
Uniform 7-polytope	7-simplex	7-orthoplex • 7-cube	7-demicube	1_{32} • 2_{31} • 3_{21}	
Uniform 8-polytope	8-simplex	8-orthoplex • 8-cube	8-demicube	1_{42} • 2_{41} • 4_{21}	
Uniform 9-polytope	9-simplex	9-orthoplex • 9-cube	9-demicube		
Uniform 10-polytope	10-simplex	10-orthoplex • 10-cube	10-demicube		
Uniform n-polytope	n-simplex	n-orthoplex • n-cube	n-demicube	1_{k2} • 2_{k1} • k_{21}	n-pentagonal polytope
Topics: Polytope families • Regular polytope • List of regular polytopes and compounds • Polytope operations
