= F4 (mathematics) =

52-dimensional exceptional simple Lie group

In mathematics, F_{4} is a Lie group and also its Lie algebra f_{4}. It is one of the five exceptional simple Lie groups. F_{4} has rank 4 and dimension 52. The compact form is simply connected and its outer automorphism group is the trivial group. Its fundamental representation is 26-dimensional.

The compact real form of F_{4} is the isometry group of a 16-dimensional Riemannian manifold known as the octonionic projective plane OP^{2}. This can be seen systematically using a construction known as the magic square, due to Hans Freudenthal and Jacques Tits.

There are 3 real forms: a compact one, a split one, and a third one. They are the isometry groups of the three real Albert algebras.

The F_{4} Lie algebra may be constructed by adding 16 generators transforming as a spinor to the 36-dimensional Lie algebra so(9), in analogy with the construction of E_{8}.

In older books and papers, F_{4} is sometimes denoted by E_{4}.

== Algebra ==
=== Dynkin diagram ===
The Dynkin diagram for F_{4} is:.

=== Weyl/Coxeter group ===
Its Weyl/Coxeter group G = W(F_{4}) is the symmetry group of the 24-cell: it is a solvable group of order 1152. It has minimal faithful degree μ(G) = 24, which is realized by the action on the 24-cell. The group has ID (1152,157478) in the small groups library.

=== Cartan matrix ===
$$\left[ \begin{array}{rrrr}
2&-1&0&0\\
-1&2&-2&0\\
0&-1&2&-1\\
0&0&-1&2
\end{array} \right]$$

=== F_{4} lattice ===
The F_{4} lattice is a four-dimensional body-centered cubic lattice (i.e. the union of two hypercubic lattices, each lying in the center of the other). They form a ring called the Hurwitz quaternion ring. The 24 Hurwitz quaternions of norm 1 form the vertices of a 24-cell centered at the origin.

=== Roots of F_{4} ===
The 24 vertices of 24-cell (red) and 24 vertices of its dual (yellow) represent the 48 root vectors of F_{4} in this Coxeter plane projection

The 48 root vectors of F_{4} can be found as the vertices of the 24-cell in two dual configurations, representing the vertices of a disphenoidal 288-cell if the edge lengths of the 24-cells are equal:

24-cell vertices:

- 24 roots by (±1, ±1, 0, 0), permuting coordinate positions

Dual 24-cell vertices:

- 8 roots by (±1, 0, 0, 0), permuting coordinate positions
- 16 roots by (±1/2, ±1/2, ±1/2, ±1/2).

==== Simple roots ====
One choice of simple roots for F_{4},, is given by the rows of the following matrix:

$$\begin{bmatrix}
0&1&-1&0 \\
0&0&1&-1 \\
0&0&0&1 \\
\frac{1}{2}&-\frac{1}{2}&-\frac{1}{2}&-\frac{1}{2}\\
\end{bmatrix}$$

The Hasse diagram for the F_{4} root poset is shown below right.

Hasse diagram of F_{4} root poset with edge labels identifying added simple root position

=== F_{4} polynomial invariant ===
Just as O(n) is the group of automorphisms which keep the quadratic polynomials x^{2} + y^{2} + ... invariant, F_{4} is the group of automorphisms of the following set of 3 polynomials in 27 variables. (The first can easily be substituted into other two making 26 variables).

$$C_1 = x+y+z$$
$$C_2 = x^2+y^2+z^2+2X\overline{X}+2Y\overline{Y}+2Z\overline{Z}$$
$$C_3 = xyz - xX\overline{X} - yY\overline{Y} - zZ\overline{Z} + XYZ + \overline{XYZ}$$

Where x, y, z are real-valued and X, Y, Z are octonion valued. Another way of writing these invariants is as (combinations of) Tr(M), Tr(M^{2}) and Tr(M^{3}) of the hermitian octonion matrix:

$$M = \begin{bmatrix}
x & \overline{Z} & Y \\
Z & y & \overline{X} \\
\overline{Y} & X & z
\end{bmatrix}$$

The set of polynomials defines a 24-dimensional compact surface (the 24-dimensional isoparametric hypersurface in the unit sphere $C_2=1$ with three distinct principal curvatures, E. Cartan, 1939).

== Representations ==
The characters of finite dimensional representations of the real and complex Lie algebras and Lie groups are all given by the Weyl character formula. The dimensions of the smallest irreducible representations of F_{4} are (sequence A121738 in the OEIS):

1, 26, 52, 273, 324, 1053 (twice), 1274, 2652, 4096, 8424, 10829, 12376, 16302, 17901, 19278, 19448, 29172, 34749, 76076, 81081, 100776, 106496, 107406, 119119, 160056 (twice), 184756, 205751, 212992, 226746, 340119, 342056, 379848, 412776, 420147, 627912...

The 52-dimensional representation is the adjoint representation, and the 26-dimensional one is the trace-free part of the action of F_{4} on the exceptional Albert algebra of dimension 27.

There are two non-isomorphic irreducible representations in dimensions 1053, 160056, 4313088, etc. The fundamental representations are those with dimensions 52, 1274, 273, 26 (corresponding to the four nodes in the Dynkin diagram in the order such that the double arrow points from the second to the third).

Embeddings of the maximal subgroups of F_{4} up to dimension 273 with associated projection matrix are shown below.

== See also ==
- 24-cell
- Albert algebra
- Cayley plane
- Dynkin diagram
- Fundamental representation
- Simple Lie group
