= Rectified 5-cell =

Uniform polychoron

Rectified 5-cell
Schlegel diagram with the 5 tetrahedral cells shown.
Type	Uniform 4-polytope	
Schläfli symbol	t_{1}{3,3,3} or r{3,3,3} {3^{2,1}} = $\left\{\begin{array}{l}3\\3,3\end{array}\right\}$	
Coxeter-Dynkin diagram		
Cells	10	5 {3,3} 5 3.3.3.3
Faces	30 {3}	
Edges	30	
Vertices	10	
Vertex figure	Triangular prism	
Symmetry group	A_{4}, [3,3,3], order 120	
Petrie polygon	Pentagon	
Properties	convex, isogonal, isotoxal	
Uniform index	1 2 3	

The 10 vertices, and 10 of the triangle faces represent a self dual symmetric Desargues configuration, (10_{3}), seen here perspective projected into 3-dimensions, with 2 colors of vertices and triangles within the projected tetrahedral symmetry. It has the full 120 automorphisms of the rectified 5-cell.

In four-dimensional geometry, the rectified 5-cell is a uniform 4-polytope composed of 5 regular tetrahedral and 5 regular octahedral cells. Each edge has one tetrahedron and two octahedra. Each vertex has two tetrahedra and three octahedra. In total it has 30 triangle faces, 30 edges, and 10 vertices. Each vertex is surrounded by 3 octahedra and 2 tetrahedra; the vertex figure is a triangular prism.

Topologically, under its highest symmetry, [3,3,3], there is only one geometrical form, containing 5 regular tetrahedra and 5 rectified tetrahedra (which is geometrically the same as a regular octahedron). It is also topologically identical to a tetrahedron-octahedron segmentochoron.

The vertex figure of the rectified 5-cell is a uniform triangular prism, formed by three octahedra around the sides, and two tetrahedra on the opposite ends.

Despite having the same number of vertices as cells (10) and the same number of edges as faces (30), the rectified 5-cell is not self-dual because the vertex figure (a uniform triangular prism) is not a dual of the polychoron's cells.

== Wythoff construction ==
Seen in a configuration matrix, all incidence counts between elements are shown. The diagonal f-vector numbers are derived through the Wythoff construction, dividing the full group order of a subgroup order by removing one mirror at a time.

A_{4}	k-face	f_{k}	f_{0}	f_{1}	f_{2}		f_{3}		k-figure	Notes
A_{1}A_{2}	( )	f_{0}	10	6	3	6	3	2	{3}x{ }	A_{4}/A_{1}A_{2} = 5!/3!/2 = 10
A_{1}A_{1}	{ }	f_{1}	2	30	1	2	2	1	{ }v( )	A_{4}/A_{1}A_{1} = 5!/2/2 = 30
A_{2}A_{1}	{3}	f_{2}	3	3	10	*	2	0	{ }	A_{4}/A_{2}A_{1} = 5!/3!/2 = 10
A_{2}	{3}	f_{2}	3	3	*	20	1	1	{ }	A_{4}/A_{2} = 5!/3! = 20
A_{3}	r{3,3}	f_{3}	6	12	4	4	5	*	( )	A_{4}/A_{3} = 5!/4! = 5
A_{3}	{3,3}	f_{3}	4	6	0	4	*	5	( )	A_{4}/A_{3} = 5!/4! = 5

== Structure ==
Together with the simplex and 24-cell, this shape and its dual (a polytope with ten vertices and ten triangular bipyramid facets) was one of the first 2-simple 2-simplicial 4-polytopes known. This means that all of its two-dimensional faces, and all of the two-dimensional faces of its dual, are triangles. In 1997, Tom Braden found another dual pair of examples, by gluing two rectified 5-cells together; since then, infinitely many 2-simple 2-simplicial polytopes have been constructed.

== Semiregular polytope ==
It is one of three semiregular 4-polytopes made of two or more cells which are Platonic solids, discovered by Thorold Gosset in his 1900 paper. He called it a tetroctahedric for being made of tetrahedron and octahedron cells.

E. L. Elte identified it in 1912 as a semiregular polytope, labeling it as tC_{5}.

== Alternate names ==
- Tetroctahedric (Thorold Gosset)
- Dispentachoron
- Rectified 5-cell (Norman W. Johnson)
- Rectified 4-simplex
- Fully truncated 4-simplex
- Rectified pentachoron (Acronym: rap) (Jonathan Bowers)
- Ambopentachoron (Neil Sloane & John Horton Conway)
- (5,2)-hypersimplex (the convex hull of five-dimensional (0,1)-vectors with exactly two ones)

== Images ==
orthographic projections
A_{k} Coxeter plane	A_{4}	A_{3}	A_{2}
Graph			
Dihedral symmetry	[5]	[4]	[3]

stereographic projection (centered on octahedron)	Net (polytope)
	Tetrahedron-centered perspective projection into 3D space, with nearest tetrahedron to the 4D viewpoint rendered in red, and the 4 surrounding octahedra in green. Cells lying on the far side of the polytope have been culled for clarity (although they can be discerned from the edge outlines). The rotation is only of the 3D projection image, in order to show its structure, not a rotation in 4D space.

== Coordinates ==
The Cartesian coordinates of the vertices of an origin-centered rectified 5-cell having edge length 2 are:

Coordinates
$$\left(\sqrt{\frac{2}{5}},\   \frac{2}{\sqrt{6}},\  \frac{2}{\sqrt{3}},\  0   \right)$$ $$\left(\sqrt{\frac{2}{5}},\   \frac{2}{\sqrt{6}},\  \frac{-1}{\sqrt{3}},\ \pm1\right)$$ $$\left(\sqrt{\frac{2}{5}},\   \frac{-2}{\sqrt{6}},\ \frac{1}{\sqrt{3}},\  \pm1\right)$$ $$\left(\sqrt{\frac{2}{5}},\   \frac{-2}{\sqrt{6}},\ \frac{-2}{\sqrt{3}},\ 0   \right)$$	$$\left(\frac{-3}{\sqrt{10}},\ \frac{1}{\sqrt{6}},\  \frac{1}{\sqrt{3}},\  \pm1\right)$$ $$\left(\frac{-3}{\sqrt{10}},\ \frac{1}{\sqrt{6}},\  \frac{-2}{\sqrt{3}},\ 0   \right)$$ $$\left(\frac{-3}{\sqrt{10}},\ -\sqrt{\frac{3}{2}},\ 0,\                   0   \right)$$

More simply, the vertices of the rectified 5-cell can be positioned on a hyperplane in 5-space as permutations of (0,0,0,1,1) or (0,0,1,1,1). These construction can be seen as positive orthant facets of the rectified pentacross or birectified penteract respectively.

== Related 4-polytopes ==
The rectified 5-cell is the vertex figure of the 5-demicube, and the edge figure of the uniform 2_{21} polytope.

=== Compound of the rectified 5-cell and its dual ===
The convex hull the rectified 5-cell and its dual (of the same long radius) is a nonuniform polychoron composed of 30 cells: 10 tetrahedra, 20 octahedra (as triangular antiprisms), and 20 vertices. Its vertex figure is a triangular bifrustum.

=== Pentachoron polytopes ===
The rectified 5-cell is one of 9 Uniform 4-polytopes constructed from the [3,3,3] Coxeter group.

Name	5-cell	truncated 5-cell	rectified 5-cell	cantellated 5-cell	bitruncated 5-cell	cantitruncated 5-cell	runcinated 5-cell	runcitruncated 5-cell	omnitruncated 5-cell
Schläfli symbol	{3,3,3} 3r{3,3,3}	t{3,3,3} 3t{3,3,3}	r{3,3,3} 2r{3,3,3}	rr{3,3,3} r2r{3,3,3}	2t{3,3,3}	tr{3,3,3} t2r{3,3,3}	t_{0,3}{3,3,3}	t_{0,1,3}{3,3,3} t_{0,2,3}{3,3,3}	t_{0,1,2,3}{3,3,3}
Coxeter diagram									
Schlegel diagram									
A_{4} Coxeter plane Graph									
A_{3} Coxeter plane Graph									
A_{2} Coxeter plane Graph									

=== Semiregular polytopes ===
The rectified 5-cell is second in a dimensional series of semiregular polytopes. Each progressive uniform polytope is constructed as the vertex figure of the previous polytope. Thorold Gosset identified this series in 1900 as containing all regular polytope facets, containing all simplexes and orthoplexes (tetrahedrons and octahedrons in the case of the rectified 5-cell). The Coxeter symbol for the rectified 5-cell is 0_{21}.

k_{21} figures in n dimensions
Space	Finite						Euclidean	Hyperbolic
E_{n}	3	4	5	6	7	8	9	10
Coxeter group	E_{3}=A_{2}A_{1}	E_{4}=A_{4}	E_{5}=D_{5}	E_{6}	E_{7}	E_{8}	E_{9} = ${\tilde{E}}_{8}$ = E_{8}^{+}	E_{10} = ${\bar{T}}_8$ = E_{8}^{++}
Coxeter diagram								
Symmetry	[3^{−1,2,1}]	[3^{0,2,1}]	[3^{1,2,1}]	[3^{2,2,1}]	[3^{3,2,1}]	[3^{4,2,1}]	[3^{5,2,1}]	[3^{6,2,1}]
Order	12	120	1,920	51,840	2,903,040	696,729,600	∞	
Graph							-	-
Name	−1_{21}	0_{21}	1_{21}	2_{21}	3_{21}	4_{21}	5_{21}	6_{21}

=== Isotopic polytopes ===
Isotopic uniform truncated simplices
Dim.	2	3	4	5	6	7	8
Name Coxeter	Hexagon = t{3} = {6}	Octahedron = r{3,3} = {3^{1,1}} = {3,4} $\left\{\begin{array}{l}3\\3\end{array}\right\}$	Decachoron 2t{3^{3}}	Dodecateron 2r{3^{4}} = {3^{2,2}} $\left\{\begin{array}{l}3, 3\\3 ,3\end{array}\right\}$	Tetradecapeton 3t{3^{5}}	Hexadecaexon 3r{3^{6}} = {3^{3,3}} $\left\{\begin{array}{l}3, 3, 3\\3, 3, 3\end{array}\right\}$	Octadecazetton 4t{3^{7}}
Images							
Vertex figure	( )∨( )	{ }×{ }	{ }∨{ }	{3}×{3}	{3}∨{3}	{3,3}×{3,3}	{3,3}∨{3,3}
Facets		{3}	t{3,3}	r{3,3,3}	2t{3,3,3,3}	2r{3,3,3,3,3}	3t{3,3,3,3,3,3}
As intersecting dual simplexes	∩	∩	∩	∩	∩	∩	∩

== Notes ==
Fundamental convex regular and uniform polytopes in dimensions 2–10
Family	A_{n}	B_{n}	I_{2}(p) / D_{n}	E_{6} / E_{7} / E_{8} / F_{4} / G_{2}	H_{n}
Regular polygon	Triangle	Square	p-gon	Hexagon	Pentagon
Uniform polyhedron	Tetrahedron	Octahedron • Cube	Demicube		Dodecahedron • Icosahedron
Uniform polychoron	Pentachoron	16-cell • Tesseract	Demitesseract	24-cell	120-cell • 600-cell
Uniform 5-polytope	5-simplex	5-orthoplex • 5-cube	5-demicube		
Uniform 6-polytope	6-simplex	6-orthoplex • 6-cube	6-demicube	1_{22} • 2_{21}	
Uniform 7-polytope	7-simplex	7-orthoplex • 7-cube	7-demicube	1_{32} • 2_{31} • 3_{21}	
Uniform 8-polytope	8-simplex	8-orthoplex • 8-cube	8-demicube	1_{42} • 2_{41} • 4_{21}	
Uniform 9-polytope	9-simplex	9-orthoplex • 9-cube	9-demicube		
Uniform 10-polytope	10-simplex	10-orthoplex • 10-cube	10-demicube		
Uniform n-polytope	n-simplex	n-orthoplex • n-cube	n-demicube	1_{k2} • 2_{k1} • k_{21}	n-pentagonal polytope
Topics: Polytope families • Regular polytope • List of regular polytopes and compounds • Polytope operations
