= Truncated 5-cell =

5-cell	Truncated 5-cell	Bitruncated 5-cell
Schlegel diagrams centered on [3,3] (cells at opposite at [3,3])

In geometry, a truncated 5-cell is a uniform 4-polytope (4-dimensional uniform polytope) formed as the truncation of the regular 5-cell.

There are two degrees of truncations, including a bitruncation.

== Truncated 5-cell ==
Truncated 5-cell
Schlegel diagram (tetrahedron cells visible)
Type	Uniform 4-polytope	
Schläfli symbol	t_{0,1}{3,3,3} t{3,3,3}	
Coxeter diagram		
Cells	10	5 (3.3.3); 5 (3.6.6)
Faces	30	20 {3} 10 {6}
Edges	40	
Vertices	20	
Vertex figure	Equilateral-triangular pyramid	
Symmetry group	A_{4}, [3,3,3], order 120	
Properties	convex, isogonal	
Uniform index	2 3 4	

The truncated 5-cell, truncated pentachoron or truncated 4-simplex is bounded by 10 cells: 5 tetrahedra, and 5 truncated tetrahedra. Each vertex is surrounded by 3 truncated tetrahedra and one tetrahedron; the vertex figure is an elongated tetrahedron.

=== Construction ===
The truncated 5-cell may be constructed from the 5-cell by truncating its vertices at 1/3 of its edge length. This transforms the 5 tetrahedral cells into truncated tetrahedra, and introduces 5 new tetrahedral cells positioned near the original vertices.

=== Structure ===
The truncated tetrahedra are joined to each other at their hexagonal faces, and to the tetrahedra at their triangular faces.

Seen in a configuration matrix, all incidence counts between elements are shown. The diagonal f-vector numbers are derived through the Wythoff construction, dividing the full group order of a subgroup order by removing one mirror at a time.

A_{4}	k-face	f_{k}	f_{0}	f_{1}		f_{2}		f_{3}		k-figure	Notes
A_{2}	( )	f_{0}	20	1	3	3	3	3	1	{3}v( )	A_{4}/A_{2} = 5!/3! = 20
A_{2}A_{1}	{ }	f_{1}	2	10	*	3	0	3	0	{3}	A_{4}/A_{2}A_{1} = 5!/3!/2 = 10
A_{1}A_{1}	{ }	f_{1}	2	*	30	1	2	2	1	{ }v( )	A_{4}/A_{1}A_{1} = 5!/2/2 = 30
A_{2}A_{1}	t{3}	f_{2}	6	3	3	10	*	2	0	{ }	A_{4}/A_{2}A_{1} = 5!/3!/2 = 10
A_{2}	{3}	f_{2}	3	0	3	*	20	1	1	{ }	A_{4}/A_{2} = 5!/3! = 20
A_{3}	t{3,3}	f_{3}	12	6	12	4	4	5	*	( )	A_{4}/A_{3} = 5!/4! = 5
A_{3}	{3,3}	f_{3}	4	0	6	0	4	*	5	( )	A_{4}/A_{3} = 5!/4! = 5

=== Projections ===
The truncated tetrahedron-first Schlegel diagram projection of the truncated 5-cell into 3-dimensional space has the following structure:

- The projection envelope is a truncated tetrahedron.
- One of the truncated tetrahedral cells project onto the entire envelope.
- One of the tetrahedral cells project onto a tetrahedron lying at the center of the envelope.
- Four flattened tetrahedra are joined to the triangular faces of the envelope, and connected to the central tetrahedron via 4 radial edges. These are the images of the remaining 4 tetrahedral cells.
- Between the central tetrahedron and the 4 hexagonal faces of the envelope are 4 irregular truncated tetrahedral volumes, which are the images of the 4 remaining truncated tetrahedral cells.

This layout of cells in projection is analogous to the layout of faces in the face-first projection of the truncated tetrahedron into 2-dimensional space. The truncated 5-cell is the 4-dimensional analogue of the truncated tetrahedron.

=== Images ===
orthographic projections
A_{k} Coxeter plane	A_{4}	A_{3}	A_{2}
Graph			
Dihedral symmetry	[5]	[4]	[3]

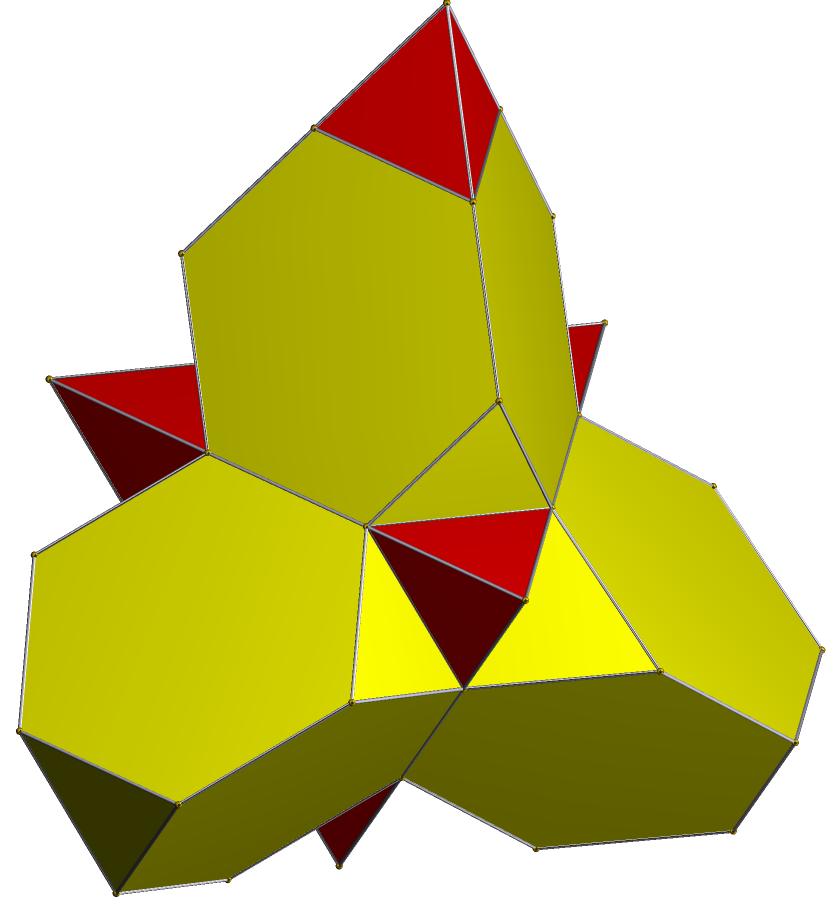
net

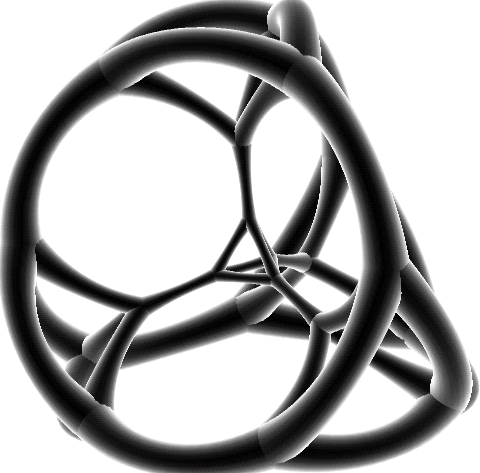
stereographic projection
(centered on truncated tetrahedron)

=== Alternate names ===
- Truncated pentatope
- Truncated 4-simplex
- Truncated pentachoron (Acronym: tip) (Jonathan Bowers)

=== Coordinates ===
The Cartesian coordinates for the vertices of an origin-centered truncated 5-cell having edge length 2 are:

$$\left( \frac{3}{\sqrt{10}},\  \sqrt{3 \over 2},\    \pm\sqrt{3},\         \pm1\right)$$ $$\left( \frac{3}{\sqrt{10}},\  \sqrt{3 \over 2},\    0,\                   \pm2\right)$$ $$\left( \frac{3}{\sqrt{10}},\  \frac{-1}{\sqrt{6}},\ \frac{2}{\sqrt{3}},\  \pm2\right)$$ $$\left( \frac{3}{\sqrt{10}},\  \frac{-1}{\sqrt{6}},\ \frac{-4}{\sqrt{3}},\  0   \right)$$ $$\left( \frac{3}{\sqrt{10}},\  \frac{-5}{\sqrt{6}},\ \frac{1}{\sqrt{3}},\  \pm1\right)$$ $$\left( \frac{3}{\sqrt{10}},\  \frac{-5}{\sqrt{6}},\ \frac{-2}{\sqrt{3}},\ 0   \right)$$	$$\left( -\sqrt{2 \over 5},\    \sqrt{2 \over 3},\    \frac{2}{\sqrt{3}},\  \pm2\right)$$ $$\left( -\sqrt{2 \over 5},\    \sqrt{2 \over 3},\    \frac{-4}{\sqrt{3}},\ 0   \right)$$ $$\left( -\sqrt{2 \over 5},\    -\sqrt{6},\           0,\                   0   \right)$$ $$\left( \frac{-7}{\sqrt{10}},\ \frac{1}{\sqrt{6}},\  \frac{1}{\sqrt{3}},\  \pm1\right)$$ $$\left( \frac{-7}{\sqrt{10}},\ \frac{1}{\sqrt{6}},\  \frac{-2}{\sqrt{3}},\ 0   \right)$$ $$\left( \frac{-7}{\sqrt{10}},\ -\sqrt{3 \over 2},\   0,\                   0   \right)$$

More simply, the vertices of the truncated 5-cell can be constructed on a hyperplane in 5-space as permutations of (0,0,0,1,2) or of (0,1,2,2,2). These coordinates come from positive orthant facets of the truncated pentacross and bitruncated penteract respectively.

=== Related polytopes ===
The convex hull of the truncated 5-cell and its dual (assuming that they are congruent) is a nonuniform polychoron composed of 60 cells: 10 tetrahedra, 20 octahedra (as triangular antiprisms), 30 tetrahedra (as tetragonal disphenoids), and 40 vertices. Its vertex figure is a hexakis triangular cupola.

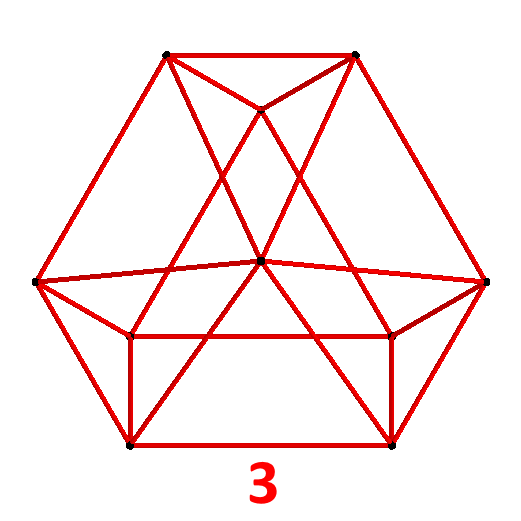
Vertex figure

== Bitruncated 5-cell ==
Bitruncated 5-cell
Schlegel diagram with alternate cells hidden.
Type	Uniform 4-polytope	
Schläfli symbol	t_{1,2}{3,3,3} 2t{3,3,3}	
Coxeter diagram	or or	
Cells	10 (3.6.6)	
Faces	40	20 {3} 20 {6}
Edges	60	
Vertices	30	
Vertex figure	({ }v{ })	
dual polytope	Disphenoidal 30-cell	
Symmetry group	Aut(A_{4}), [[3,3,3]], order 240	
Properties	convex, isogonal, isotoxal, isochoric	
Uniform index	5 6 7	

The bitruncated 5-cell (also called a bitruncated pentachoron, decachoron and 10-cell) is a 4-dimensional polytope, or 4-polytope, composed of 10 cells in the shape of truncated tetrahedra.

Topologically, under its highest symmetry, [[3,3,3]], there is only one geometrical form, containing 10 uniform truncated tetrahedra. The hexagons are always regular because of the polychoron's inversion symmetry, of which the regular hexagon is the only such case among ditrigons (an isogonal hexagon with 3-fold symmetry).

E. L. Elte identified it in 1912 as a semiregular polytope.

Each hexagonal face of the truncated tetrahedra is joined in complementary orientation to the neighboring truncated tetrahedron. Each edge is shared by two hexagons and one triangle. Each vertex is surrounded by 4 truncated tetrahedral cells in a tetragonal disphenoid vertex figure.

The bitruncated 5-cell is the 4-space intersection of six compounded pentachora in dual configuration, their common interior. Its vertices lie at the intersection of the six pentachorons' 60 edges, at 30 points of intersection where 4 edges, from four of the pentachorons, intersect orthogonally. Each bitruncated edge is truncated at both ends, and has two points of intersection on it. The convex hull of this star compound of six regular 5-cells is also a bitruncated 5-cell.

As such, it is also the intersection of a penteract with the hyperplane that bisects the penteract's long diagonal orthogonally. In this sense it is a 4-dimensional analog of the regular octahedron (intersection of regular tetrahedra in dual configuration / tesseract bisection on long diagonal) and the regular hexagon (equilateral triangles / cube). The 5-dimensional analog is the birectified 5-simplex, and the $n$-dimensional analog is the polytope whose Coxeter–Dynkin diagram is linear with rings on the middle one or two nodes.

The bitruncated 5-cell is one of the two non-regular convex uniform 4-polytopes which are cell-transitive. The other is the bitruncated 24-cell, which is composed of 48 truncated cubes.

=== Symmetry ===
This 4-polytope has a higher extended pentachoric symmetry (2×A_{4}, [[3,3,3]]), doubled to order 240, because the element corresponding to any element of the underlying 5-cell can be exchanged with one of those corresponding to an element of its dual.

=== Alternative names ===
- Bitruncated 5-cell (Norman W. Johnson)
- 10-cell as a cell-transitive 4-polytope
- Bitruncated pentachoron
- Bitruncated pentatope
- Bitruncated 4-simplex
- Decachoron (Acronym: deca) (Jonathan Bowers)

=== Images ===
orthographic projections
A_{k} Coxeter plane	A_{4}	A_{3}	A_{2}
Graph			
Dihedral symmetry	[[5]] = [10]	[4]	[[3]] = [6]

stereographic projection of spherical 4-polytope (centred on a hexagon face)	Net (polytope)

=== Coordinates ===
The Cartesian coordinates of an origin-centered bitruncated 5-cell having edge length 2 are:

Coordinates
$$\pm\left(\sqrt{\frac{5}{2}},\ \frac{5}{\sqrt{6}},\  \frac{2}{\sqrt{3}},\  0\right)$$ $$\pm\left(\sqrt{\frac{5}{2}},\ \frac{5}{\sqrt{6}},\  \frac{-1}{\sqrt{3}},\ \pm1\right)$$ $$\pm\left(\sqrt{\frac{5}{2}},\ \frac{1}{\sqrt{6}},\  \frac{4}{\sqrt{3}},\  0\right)$$ $$\pm\left(\sqrt{\frac{5}{2}},\ \frac{1}{\sqrt{6}},\  \frac{-2}{\sqrt{3}},\ \pm2\right)$$	$$\pm\left(\sqrt{\frac{5}{2}},\ -\sqrt{\frac{3}{2}},\ \pm\sqrt{3},\         \pm1\right)$$ $$\pm\left(\sqrt{\frac{5}{2}},\ -\sqrt{\frac{3}{2}},\ 0,\                   \pm2\right)$$ $$\pm\left(0,\                  2\sqrt{\frac{2}{3}},\ \frac{4}{\sqrt{3}},\  0\right)$$ $$\pm\left(0,\                  2\sqrt{\frac{2}{3}},\ \frac{-2}{\sqrt{3}},\ \pm2\right)$$

More simply, the vertices of the bitruncated 5-cell can be constructed on a hyperplane in 5-space as permutations of (0,0,1,2,2). These represent positive orthant facets of the bitruncated pentacross. Another 5-space construction, centered on the origin are all 20 permutations of (-1,-1,0,1,1).

==== Related polytopes ====
The bitruncated 5-cell can be seen as the intersection of two regular 5-cells in dual positions. = ∩.

Isotopic uniform truncated simplices
Dim.	2	3	4	5	6	7	8
Name Coxeter	Hexagon = t{3} = {6}	Octahedron = r{3,3} = {3^{1,1}} = {3,4} $\left\{\begin{array}{l}3\\3\end{array}\right\}$	Decachoron 2t{3^{3}}	Dodecateron 2r{3^{4}} = {3^{2,2}} $\left\{\begin{array}{l}3, 3\\3 ,3\end{array}\right\}$	Tetradecapeton 3t{3^{5}}	Hexadecaexon 3r{3^{6}} = {3^{3,3}} $\left\{\begin{array}{l}3, 3, 3\\3, 3, 3\end{array}\right\}$	Octadecazetton 4t{3^{7}}
Images							
Vertex figure	( )∨( )	{ }×{ }	{ }∨{ }	{3}×{3}	{3}∨{3}	{3,3}×{3,3}	{3,3}∨{3,3}
Facets		{3}	t{3,3}	r{3,3,3}	2t{3,3,3,3}	2r{3,3,3,3,3}	3t{3,3,3,3,3,3}
As intersecting dual simplexes	∩	∩	∩	∩	∩	∩	∩

=== Configuration ===
Seen in a configuration matrix, all incidence counts between elements are shown. The diagonal f-vector numbers are derived through the Wythoff construction, dividing the full group order of a subgroup order by removing one mirror at a time.

Element	f_{k}	f_{0}	f_{1}		f_{2}			f_{3}	
	f_{0}	30	2	2	1	4	1	2	2
	f_{1}	2	30	*	1	2	0	2	1
	f_{1}	2	*	30	0	2	1	1	2
	f_{2}	3	3	0	10	*	*	2	0
	f_{2}	6	3	3	*	20	*	1	1
	f_{2}	3	0	3	*	*	10	0	2
	f_{3}	12	12	6	4	4	0	5	*
	f_{3}	12	6	12	0	4	4	*	5

=== Related regular skew polyhedron ===
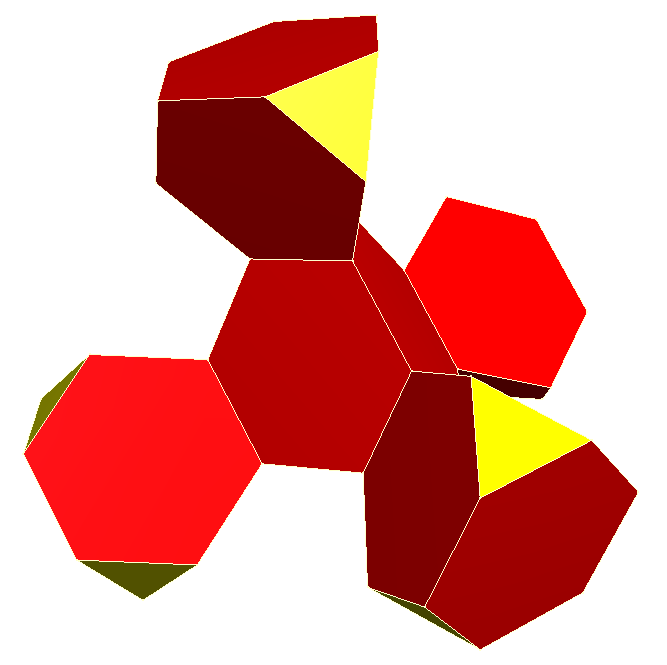
A 3D net for {6,4|3}, with pairs of yellow triangles folded together into 4D and removed

The regular skew polyhedron, {6,4|3}, exists in 4-space with 4 hexagonal around each vertex, in a zig-zagging nonplanar vertex figure. These hexagonal faces can be seen on the bitruncated 5-cell, using all 60 edges and 30 vertices. The 20 triangular faces of the bitruncated 5-cell can be seen as removed. The dual regular skew polyhedron, {4,6|3}, is similarly related to the square faces of the runcinated 5-cell.

=== Disphenoidal 30-cell ===
Disphenoidal 30-cell
Type	perfect polychoron	
Symbol	f_{1,2}A_{4}	
Coxeter		
Cells	30 congruent tetragonal disphenoids	
Faces	60 congruent isosceles triangles (2 short edges)	
Edges	40	20 of length $\scriptstyle 1$ 20 of length $\scriptstyle \sqrt{3/5}$
Vertices	10	
Vertex figure	(Triakis tetrahedron)	
Dual	Bitruncated 5-cell	
Coxeter group	Aut(A_{4}), [[3,3,3]], order 240	
Orbit vector	(1, 2, 1, 1)	
Properties	convex, isochoric	

The disphenoidal 30-cell is the dual of the bitruncated 5-cell. It is a 4-dimensional polytope (or polychoron) derived from the 5-cell. It is the convex hull of two 5-cells in opposite orientations.

Being the dual of a uniform polychoron, it is cell-transitive, consisting of 30 congruent tetragonal disphenoids. In addition, it is vertex-transitive under the group Aut(A_{4}).

== Related polytopes ==
These polytope are from a set of 9 uniform 4-polytope constructed from the [3,3,3] Coxeter group.

Name	5-cell	truncated 5-cell	rectified 5-cell	cantellated 5-cell	bitruncated 5-cell	cantitruncated 5-cell	runcinated 5-cell	runcitruncated 5-cell	omnitruncated 5-cell
Schläfli symbol	{3,3,3} 3r{3,3,3}	t{3,3,3} 3t{3,3,3}	r{3,3,3} 2r{3,3,3}	rr{3,3,3} r2r{3,3,3}	2t{3,3,3}	tr{3,3,3} t2r{3,3,3}	t_{0,3}{3,3,3}	t_{0,1,3}{3,3,3} t_{0,2,3}{3,3,3}	t_{0,1,2,3}{3,3,3}
Coxeter diagram									
Schlegel diagram									
A_{4} Coxeter plane Graph									
A_{3} Coxeter plane Graph									
A_{2} Coxeter plane Graph									

Fundamental convex regular and uniform polytopes in dimensions 2–10
Family	A_{n}	B_{n}	I_{2}(p) / D_{n}	E_{6} / E_{7} / E_{8} / F_{4} / G_{2}	H_{n}
Regular polygon	Triangle	Square	p-gon	Hexagon	Pentagon
Uniform polyhedron	Tetrahedron	Octahedron • Cube	Demicube		Dodecahedron • Icosahedron
Uniform polychoron	Pentachoron	16-cell • Tesseract	Demitesseract	24-cell	120-cell • 600-cell
Uniform 5-polytope	5-simplex	5-orthoplex • 5-cube	5-demicube		
Uniform 6-polytope	6-simplex	6-orthoplex • 6-cube	6-demicube	1_{22} • 2_{21}	
Uniform 7-polytope	7-simplex	7-orthoplex • 7-cube	7-demicube	1_{32} • 2_{31} • 3_{21}	
Uniform 8-polytope	8-simplex	8-orthoplex • 8-cube	8-demicube	1_{42} • 2_{41} • 4_{21}	
Uniform 9-polytope	9-simplex	9-orthoplex • 9-cube	9-demicube		
Uniform 10-polytope	10-simplex	10-orthoplex • 10-cube	10-demicube		
Uniform n-polytope	n-simplex	n-orthoplex • n-cube	n-demicube	1_{k2} • 2_{k1} • k_{21}	n-pentagonal polytope
Topics: Polytope families • Regular polytope • List of regular polytopes and compounds • Polytope operations
