= Great duoantiprism =

Uniform 4-polytope

Great duoantiprism
Type	Uniform polychoron
Schläfli symbols	s{5}s{5/3} {5}⊗{5/3} h{10}s{5/3} s{5}h{10/3} h{10}h{10/3}
Coxeter diagrams	
Cells	50 tetrahedra 10 pentagonal antiprisms 10 pentagrammic crossed-antiprisms
Faces	200 triangles 10 pentagons 10 pentagrams
Edges	200
Vertices	50
Vertex figure	star-gyrobifastigium
Symmetry group	[5,2,5]^{+}, order 50 [(5,2)^{+},10], order 100 [10,2^{+},10], order 200
Properties	Vertex-uniform
Net (overlapping in space)

In geometry, the great duoantiprism is the only uniform star-duoantiprism solution p = 5, q = 5/3, in 4-dimensional geometry. It has Schläfli symbol {5}⊗{5/3}, s{5}s{5/3} or ht_{0,1,2,3}{5,2,5/3}, Coxeter diagram, constructed from 10 pentagonal antiprisms, 10 pentagrammic crossed-antiprisms, and 50 tetrahedra.

Its vertices are a subset of those of the small stellated 120-cell.

== Construction ==
The great duoantiprism can be constructed from a nonuniform variant of the 10-10/3 duoprism (a duoprism of a decagon and a decagram) where the decagram's edge length is around 1.618 (golden ratio) times the edge length of the decagon via an alternation process. The decagonal prisms alternate into pentagonal antiprisms, the decagrammic prisms alternate into pentagrammic crossed-antiprisms with new regular tetrahedra created at the deleted vertices. This is the only uniform solution for the p-q duoantiprism aside from the regular 16-cell (as a 2-2 duoantiprism).

== Images ==
stereographic projection, centered on one pentagrammic crossed-antiprism	Orthogonal projection, with vertices colored by overlaps, red, orange, yellow, green have 1, 2, 3,4 multiplicity.

== Other names ==
- Great duoantiprism (gudap) Jonathan Bowers
