= Cantellated 5-cell =

5-cell	Cantellated 5-cell	Cantitruncated 5-cell
Orthogonal projections in A_{4} Coxeter plane

In four-dimensional geometry, a cantellated 5-cell is a convex uniform 4-polytope, being a cantellation (a 2nd order truncation, up to edge-planing) of the regular 5-cell.

== Cantellated 5-cell ==
Cantellated 5-cell
Schlegel diagram with octahedral cells shown
Type	Uniform 4-polytope	
Schläfli symbol	t_{0,2}{3,3,3} rr{3,3,3}	
Coxeter diagram		
Cells	20	5 (3.4.3.4); 5 (3.3.3.3); 10 (3.4.4)
Faces	80	50{3} 30{4}
Edges	90	
Vertices	30	
Vertex figure	Square wedge	
Symmetry group	A_{4}, [3,3,3], order 120	
Properties	convex, isogonal	
Uniform index	3 4 5	

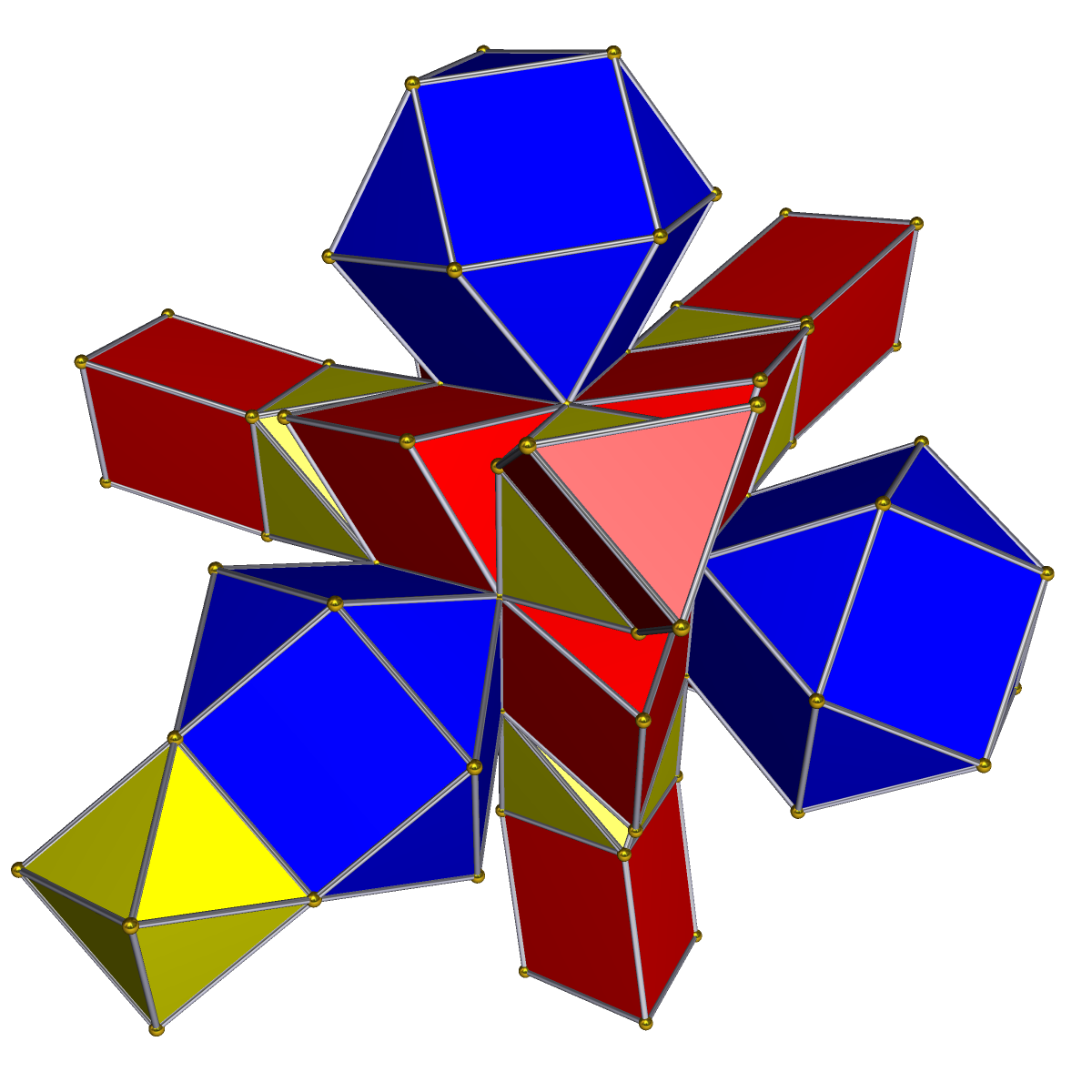
Net

The cantellated 5-cell or small rhombated pentachoron is a uniform 4-polytope. It has 30 vertices, 90 edges, 80 faces, and 20 cells. The cells are 5 cuboctahedra, 5 octahedra, and 10 triangular prisms. Each vertex is surrounded by 2 cuboctahedra, 2 triangular prisms, and 1 octahedron; the vertex figure is a nonuniform triangular prism.

=== Alternate names ===
- Cantellated pentachoron
- Cantellated 4-simplex
- (small) prismatodispentachoron
- Rectified dispentachoron
- Small rhombated pentachoron (Acronym: Srip) (Jonathan Bowers)

=== Configuration ===
Seen in a configuration matrix, all incidence counts between elements are shown. The diagonal f-vector numbers are derived through the Wythoff construction, dividing the full group order of a subgroup order by removing one mirror at a time.

Element	f_{k}	f_{0}	f_{1}		f_{2}				f_{3}		
	f_{0}	30	2	4	1	4	2	2	2	2	1
	f_{1}	2	30	*	1	2	0	0	2	1	0
	f_{1}	2	*	60	0	1	1	1	1	1	1
	f_{2}	3	3	0	10	*	*	*	2	0	0
	f_{2}	4	2	2	*	30	*	*	1	1	0
	f_{2}	3	0	3	*	*	20	*	1	0	1
	f_{2}	3	0	3	*	*	*	20	0	1	1
	f_{3}	12	12	12	4	6	4	0	5	*	*
	f_{3}	6	3	6	0	3	0	2	*	10	*
	f_{3}	6	0	12	0	0	4	4	*	*	5

=== Images ===
orthographic projections
A_{k} Coxeter plane	A_{4}	A_{3}	A_{2}
Graph			
Dihedral symmetry	[5]	[4]	[3]

Wireframe	Ten triangular prisms colored green	Five octahedra colored blue

=== Coordinates ===
The Cartesian coordinates of the vertices of the origin-centered cantellated 5-cell having edge length 2 are:

Coordinates
$$\left(2\sqrt{\frac{2}{5}},\  2\sqrt{\frac{2}{3}},\ \frac{1}{\sqrt{3}},\  \pm1\right)$$ $$\left(2\sqrt{\frac{2}{5}},\  2\sqrt{\frac{2}{3}},\ \frac{-2}{\sqrt{3}},\ 0\right)$$ $$\left(2\sqrt{\frac{2}{5}},\  0,\                   \pm\sqrt{3},\         \pm1\right)$$ $$\left(2\sqrt{\frac{2}{5}},\  0,\                   0,\                   \pm2\right)$$ $$\left(2\sqrt{\frac{2}{5}},\ -2\sqrt{\frac{2}{3}},\ \frac{2}{\sqrt{3}},\  0\right)$$ $$\left(2\sqrt{\frac{2}{5}},\ -2\sqrt{\frac{2}{3}},\ \frac{-1}{\sqrt{3}},\ \pm1\right)$$ $$\left(\frac{-1}{\sqrt{10}},\ \sqrt{\frac{3}{2}},\  \pm\sqrt{3},\         \pm1\right)$$	$$\left(\frac{-1}{\sqrt{10}},\ \sqrt{\frac{3}{2}},\  0,\                   \pm2\right)$$ $$\left(\frac{-1}{\sqrt{10}},\ \frac{-1}{\sqrt{6}},\ \frac{2}{\sqrt{3}},\  \pm2\right)$$ $$\left(\frac{-1}{\sqrt{10}},\ \frac{-1}{\sqrt{6}},\ \frac{-4}{\sqrt{3}},\ 0\right)$$ $$\left(\frac{-1}{\sqrt{10}},\ \frac{-5}{\sqrt{6}},\ \frac{1}{\sqrt{3}},\  \pm1\right)$$ $$\left(\frac{-1}{\sqrt{10}},\ \frac{-5}{\sqrt{6}},\ \frac{-2}{\sqrt{3}},\ 0\right)$$ $$\left(-3\sqrt{\frac{2}{5}},\ 0,\ 0,\ 0\right) \pm \left(0,\ \sqrt{\frac{2}{3}},\  \frac{2}{\sqrt{3}},\  0\right)$$ $$\left(-3\sqrt{\frac{2}{5}},\ 0,\ 0,\ 0\right) \pm \left(0,\ \sqrt{\frac{2}{3}},\ \frac{-1}{\sqrt{3}},\ \pm1\right)$$

The vertices of the cantellated 5-cell can be most simply positioned in 5-space as permutations of:

(0,0,1,1,2)

This construction is from the positive orthant facet of the cantellated 5-orthoplex.

=== Related polytopes ===
The convex hull of two cantellated 5-cells in opposite positions is a nonuniform polychoron composed of 100 cells: three kinds of 70 octahedra (10 rectified tetrahedra, 20 triangular antiprisms, 40 triangular antipodiums), 30 tetrahedra (as tetragonal disphenoids), and 60 vertices. Its vertex figure is a shape topologically equivalent to a cube with a triangular prism attached to one of its square faces.

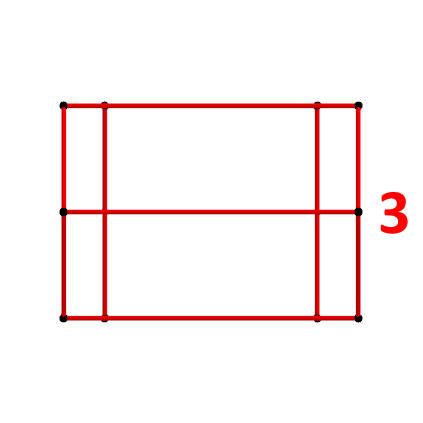
Vertex figure

== Cantitruncated 5-cell ==
Cantitruncated 5-cell
Schlegel diagram with Truncated tetrahedral cells shown
Type	Uniform 4-polytope	
Schläfli symbol	t_{0,1,2}{3,3,3} tr{3,3,3}	
Coxeter diagram		
Cells	20	5 (4.6.6); 10 (3.4.4); 5 (3.6.6)
Faces	80	20{3} 30{4} 30{6}
Edges	120	
Vertices	60	
Vertex figure	sphenoid	
Symmetry group	A_{4}, [3,3,3], order 120	
Properties	convex, isogonal	
Uniform index	6 7 8	

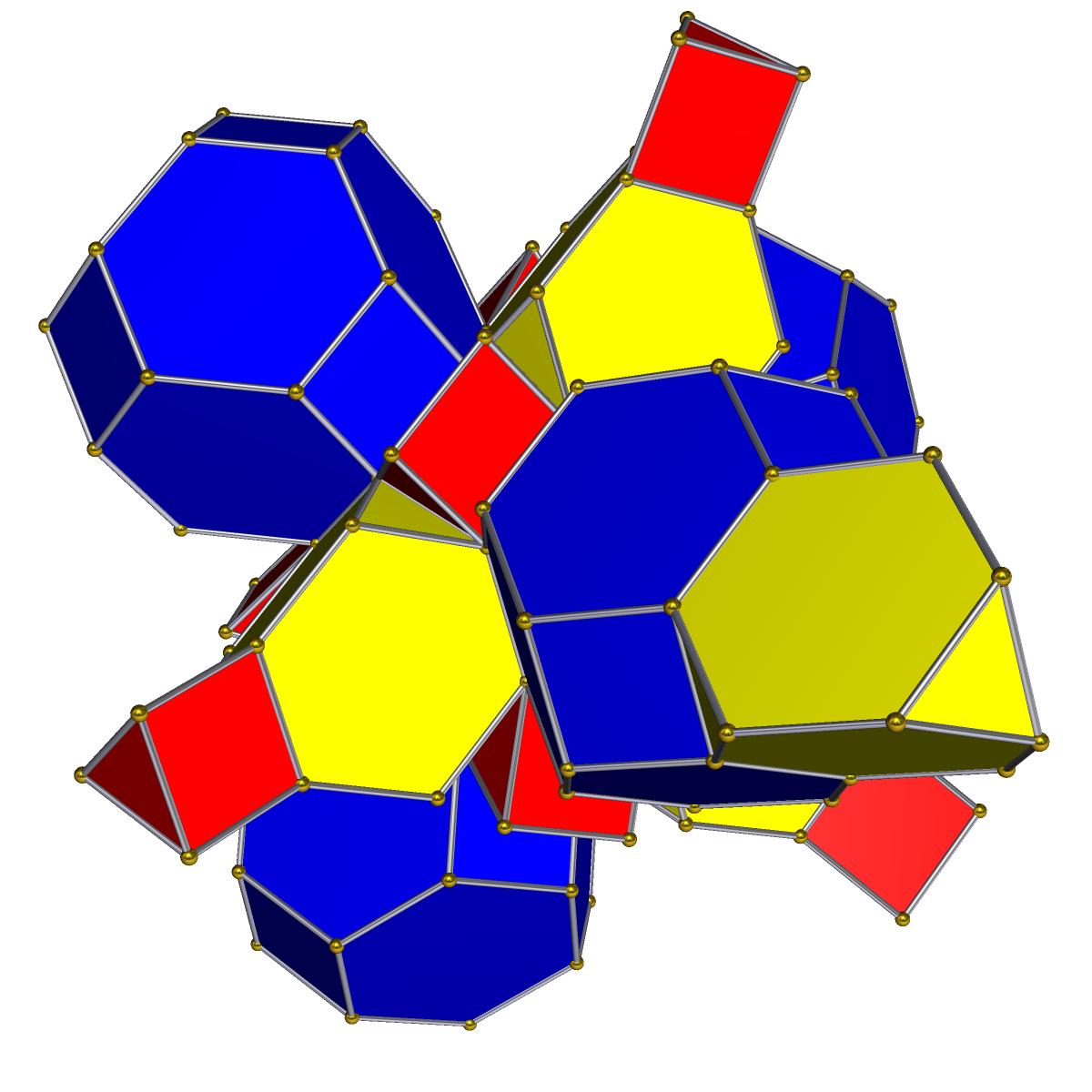
Net

The cantitruncated 5-cell or great rhombated pentachoron is a uniform 4-polytope. It is composed of 60 vertices, 120 edges, 80 faces, and 20 cells. The cells are: 5 truncated octahedra, 10 triangular prisms, and 5 truncated tetrahedra. Each vertex is surrounded by 2 truncated octahedra, one triangular prism, and one truncated tetrahedron.

=== Configuration ===
Seen in a configuration matrix, all incidence counts between elements are shown. The diagonal f-vector numbers are derived through the Wythoff construction, dividing the full group order of a subgroup order by removing one mirror at a time.

Element	f_{k}	f_{0}	f_{1}			f_{2}				f_{3}		
	f_{0}	60	1	1	2	1	2	2	1	2	1	1
	f_{1}	2	30	*	*	1	2	0	0	2	1	0
	f_{1}	2	*	30	*	1	0	2	0	2	0	1
	f_{1}	2	*	*	60	0	1	1	1	1	1	1
	f_{2}	6	3	3	0	10	*	*	*	2	0	0
	f_{2}	4	2	0	2	*	30	*	*	1	1	0
	f_{2}	6	0	3	3	*	*	20	*	1	0	1
	f_{2}	3	0	0	3	*	*	*	20	0	1	1
	f_{3}	24	12	12	12	4	6	4	0	5	*	*
	f_{3}	6	3	0	6	0	3	0	2	*	10	*
	f_{3}	12	0	6	12	0	0	4	4	*	*	5

=== Alternative names ===
- Cantitruncated pentachoron
- Cantitruncated 4-simplex
- Great prismatodispentachoron
- Truncated dispentachoron
- Great rhombated pentachoron (Acronym: grip) (Jonathan Bowers)

=== Images ===
orthographic projections
A_{k} Coxeter plane	A_{4}	A_{3}	A_{2}
Graph			
Dihedral symmetry	[5]	[4]	[3]

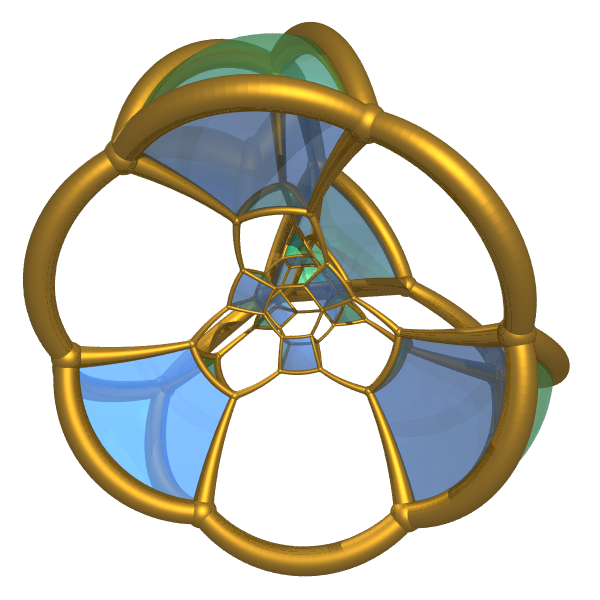
Stereographic projection with its 10 triangular prisms.

=== Cartesian coordinates ===
The Cartesian coordinates of an origin-centered cantitruncated 5-cell having edge length 2 are:

Coordinates
$$\left(3\sqrt{\frac{2}{5}},\  \pm\sqrt{6},\          \pm\sqrt{3},\         \pm1\right)$$ $$\left(3\sqrt{\frac{2}{5}},\  \pm\sqrt{6},\          0,\                   \pm2\right)$$ $$\left(3\sqrt{\frac{2}{5}},\ 0,\ 0,\ 0\right) \pm \left(0,\ \sqrt{\frac{2}{3}},\ \frac{5}{\sqrt{3}},\  \pm1\right)$$ $$\left(3\sqrt{\frac{2}{5}},\ 0,\ 0,\ 0\right) \pm \left(0,\ \sqrt{\frac{2}{3}},\ \frac{-1}{\sqrt{3}},\ \pm3\right)$$ $$\left(3\sqrt{\frac{2}{5}},\ 0,\ 0,\ 0\right) \pm \left(0,\ \sqrt{\frac{2}{3}},\ \frac{-4}{\sqrt{3}},\ \pm2\right)$$ $$\left(\frac{1}{\sqrt{10}},\  \frac{5}{\sqrt{6}},\   \frac{5}{\sqrt{3}},\  \pm1\right)$$ $$\left(\frac{1}{\sqrt{10}},\  \frac{5}{\sqrt{6}},\   \frac{-1}{\sqrt{3}},\ \pm3\right)$$ $$\left(\frac{1}{\sqrt{10}},\  \frac{5}{\sqrt{6}},\   \frac{-4}{\sqrt{3}},\ \pm2\right)$$ $$\left(\frac{1}{\sqrt{10}},\  -\sqrt{\frac{3}{2}},\  \sqrt{3},\            \pm3\right)$$ $$\left(\frac{1}{\sqrt{10}},\  -\sqrt{\frac{3}{2}},\  -2\sqrt{3},\          0\right)$$ $$\left(\frac{1}{\sqrt{10}},\  \frac{-7}{\sqrt{6}},\  \frac{2}{\sqrt{3}},\  \pm2\right)$$ $$\left(\frac{1}{\sqrt{10}},\  \frac{-7}{\sqrt{6}},\  \frac{-4}{\sqrt{3}},\ 0\right)$$ $$\left(-2\sqrt{\frac{2}{5}},\ 2\sqrt{\frac{2}{3}},\  \frac{4}{\sqrt{3}},\  \pm2\right)$$	$$\left(-2\sqrt{\frac{2}{5}},\ 2\sqrt{\frac{2}{3}},\  \frac{1}{\sqrt{3}},\  \pm3\right)$$ $$\left(-2\sqrt{\frac{2}{5}},\ 2\sqrt{\frac{2}{3}},\  \frac{-5}{\sqrt{3}},\ \pm1\right)$$ $$\left(-2\sqrt{\frac{2}{5}},\ 0,\                    \sqrt{3},\            \pm3\right)$$ $$\left(-2\sqrt{\frac{2}{5}},\ 0,\                    -2\sqrt{3},\          0\right)$$ $$\left(-2\sqrt{\frac{2}{5}},\ -4\sqrt{\frac{2}{3}},\ \frac{1}{\sqrt{3}},\  \pm1\right)$$ $$\left(-2\sqrt{\frac{2}{5}},\ -4\sqrt{\frac{2}{3}},\ \frac{-2}{\sqrt{3}},\ 0\right)$$ $$\left(\frac{-9}{\sqrt{10}},\ \sqrt{\frac{3}{2}},\   \pm\sqrt{3},\         \pm1\right)$$ $$\left(\frac{-9}{\sqrt{10}},\ \sqrt{\frac{3}{2}},\   0,\                   \pm2\right)$$ $$\left(\frac{-9}{\sqrt{10}},\ \frac{-1}{\sqrt{6}},\  \frac{2}{\sqrt{3}},\  \pm2\right)$$ $$\left(\frac{-9}{\sqrt{10}},\ \frac{-1}{\sqrt{6}},\  \frac{-4}{\sqrt{3}},\ 0\right)$$ $$\left(\frac{-9}{\sqrt{10}},\ \frac{-5}{\sqrt{6}},\  \frac{1}{\sqrt{3}},\  \pm1\right)$$ $$\left(\frac{-9}{\sqrt{10}},\ \frac{-5}{\sqrt{6}},\  \frac{-2}{\sqrt{3}},\ 0\right)$$

These vertices can be more simply constructed on a hyperplane in 5-space, as the permutations of:

(0,0,1,2,3)

This construction is from the positive orthant facet of the cantitruncated 5-orthoplex.

=== Related polytopes ===
A double symmetry construction can be made by placing truncated tetrahedra on the truncated octahedra, resulting in a nonuniform polychoron with 10 truncated tetrahedra, 20 hexagonal prisms (as ditrigonal trapezoprisms), two kinds of 80 triangular prisms (20 with D_{3h} symmetry and 60 C_{2v}-symmetric wedges), and 30 tetrahedra (as tetragonal disphenoids). Its vertex figure is topologically equivalent to the octahedron.

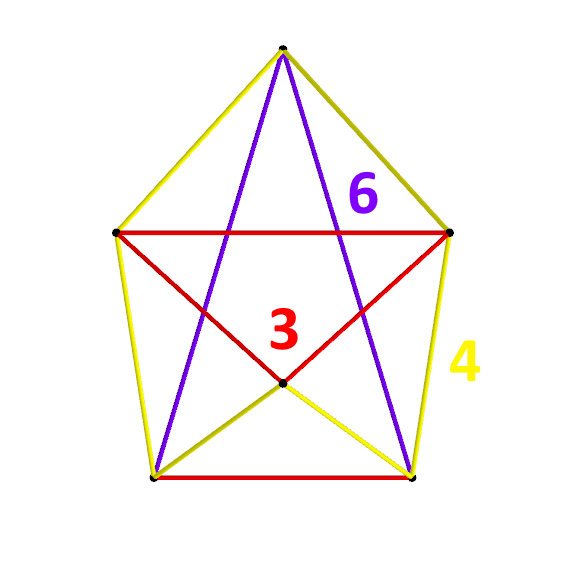
Vertex figure

== Related 4-polytopes ==
These polytopes are art of a set of 9 Uniform 4-polytopes constructed from the [3,3,3] Coxeter group.

Name	5-cell	truncated 5-cell	rectified 5-cell	cantellated 5-cell	bitruncated 5-cell	cantitruncated 5-cell	runcinated 5-cell	runcitruncated 5-cell	omnitruncated 5-cell
Schläfli symbol	{3,3,3} 3r{3,3,3}	t{3,3,3} 3t{3,3,3}	r{3,3,3} 2r{3,3,3}	rr{3,3,3} r2r{3,3,3}	2t{3,3,3}	tr{3,3,3} t2r{3,3,3}	t_{0,3}{3,3,3}	t_{0,1,3}{3,3,3} t_{0,2,3}{3,3,3}	t_{0,1,2,3}{3,3,3}
Coxeter diagram									
Schlegel diagram									
A_{4} Coxeter plane Graph									
A_{3} Coxeter plane Graph									
A_{2} Coxeter plane Graph									

Fundamental convex regular and uniform polytopes in dimensions 2–10
Family	A_{n}	B_{n}	I_{2}(p) / D_{n}	E_{6} / E_{7} / E_{8} / F_{4} / G_{2}	H_{n}
Regular polygon	Triangle	Square	p-gon	Hexagon	Pentagon
Uniform polyhedron	Tetrahedron	Octahedron • Cube	Demicube		Dodecahedron • Icosahedron
Uniform polychoron	Pentachoron	16-cell • Tesseract	Demitesseract	24-cell	120-cell • 600-cell
Uniform 5-polytope	5-simplex	5-orthoplex • 5-cube	5-demicube		
Uniform 6-polytope	6-simplex	6-orthoplex • 6-cube	6-demicube	1_{22} • 2_{21}	
Uniform 7-polytope	7-simplex	7-orthoplex • 7-cube	7-demicube	1_{32} • 2_{31} • 3_{21}	
Uniform 8-polytope	8-simplex	8-orthoplex • 8-cube	8-demicube	1_{42} • 2_{41} • 4_{21}	
Uniform 9-polytope	9-simplex	9-orthoplex • 9-cube	9-demicube		
Uniform 10-polytope	10-simplex	10-orthoplex • 10-cube	10-demicube		
Uniform n-polytope	n-simplex	n-orthoplex • n-cube	n-demicube	1_{k2} • 2_{k1} • k_{21}	n-pentagonal polytope
Topics: Polytope families • Regular polytope • List of regular polytopes and compounds • Polytope operations
