= 3-4 duoprism =

Uniform 3-4 duoprisms Schlegel diagrams
Type	Prismatic uniform polychoron
Schläfli symbol	{3}×{4}
Coxeter-Dynkin diagram	
Cells	3 square prisms, 4 triangular prisms
Faces	3+12 squares, 4 triangles
Edges	24
Vertices	12
Vertex figure	Digonal disphenoid
Symmetry	[3,2,4], order 48
Dual	3-4 duopyramid
Properties	convex, vertex-uniform

In geometry of 4 dimensions, a 3-4 duoprism, the second smallest p-q duoprism, is a 4-polytope resulting from the Cartesian product of a triangle and a square.

The 3-4 duoprism exists in some of the uniform 5-polytopes in the B5 family.

== Images ==
Net	3D projection with 3 different rotations
Skew orthogonal projections with primary triangles and squares colored

== Related complex polygons ==
Stereographic projection of complex polygon, _{3}{}×_{4}{} has 12 vertices and 7 3-edges, shown here with 4 red triangular 3-edges and 3 blue square 4-edges.

The quasiregular complex polytope _{3}{}×_{4}{},, in $\mathbb{C}^2$ has a real representation as a 3-4 duoprism in 4-dimensional space. It has 12 vertices, and 4 3-edges and 3 4-edges. Its symmetry is _{3}[2]_{4}, order 12.

== Related polytopes ==
The birectified 5-cube, has a uniform 3-4 duoprism vertex figure:

=== 3-4 duopyramid ===
3-4 duopyramid
Type	duopyramid
Schläfli symbol	{3}+{4}
Coxeter-Dynkin diagram	
Cells	12 digonal disphenoids
Faces	24 isosceles triangles
Edges	19 (12+3+4)
Vertices	7 (3+4)
Symmetry	[3,2,4], order 48
Dual	3-4 duoprism
Properties	convex, facet-transitive

The dual of a 3-4 duoprism is called a 3-4 duopyramid. It has 12 digonal disphenoid cells, 24 isosceles triangular faces, 12 edges, and 7 vertices.

Orthogonal projection	Vertex-centered perspective

== See also ==
- Polytope and polychoron
- Convex regular polychoron
- Duocylinder
- Tesseract
