= 3-3 duoprism =

Four-dimensional convex polytope

- 3D perspective projection with two different rotations
- Type: Uniform duoprism
- Schläfli symbol: {3}×{3} = {3}^{2}
- Dual: 3-3 duopyramid = cyclic polytope C(6,4)
- Properties: convex, vertex-uniform, facet-transitive, projectively unique

In the geometry of 4 dimensions, the 3-3 duoprism or triangular duoprism is a four-dimensional convex polytope.

== Descriptions ==
The duoprism is a 4-polytope that can be constructed using Cartesian product of two polygons. In the case of 3-3 duoprism is the simplest among them, and it can be constructed using Cartesian product of two triangles. The resulting duoprism has 9 vertices, 18 edges, and 15 faces—which include 9 squares and 6 triangles. Its cells are 6 triangular prisms. It has Coxeter diagram, and symmetry [[3,2,3]], order 72.

The hypervolume of a uniform 3-3 duoprism with edge length $a$ is
$$V_4 = {3\over 16}a^4.$$
This is the square of the area of an equilateral triangle,
$$A = {\sqrt3\over 4}a^2.$$

The 3-3 duoprism can be represented as a graph with the same number of vertices and edges. Like the Berlekamp–van Lint–Seidel graph and the unknown solution to Conway's 99-graph problem, every edge is part of a unique triangle and every non-adjacent pair of vertices is the diagonal of a unique square. It is a toroidal graph, a locally linear graph, a strongly regular graph with parameters (9,4,1,2), the $3\times 3$ rook's graph, and the Paley graph of order 9. This graph is also the Cayley graph of the group $G=\langle a,b:a^3=b^3=1,\ ab=ba\rangle\simeq C_3\times C_3$ with generating set $S=\{a,a^2,b,b^2\}$.

The minimal distance graph of a 3-3 duoprism may be ascertained by the Cartesian product of graphs between two identical both complete graphs $K_3$.

== 3-3 duopyramid ==
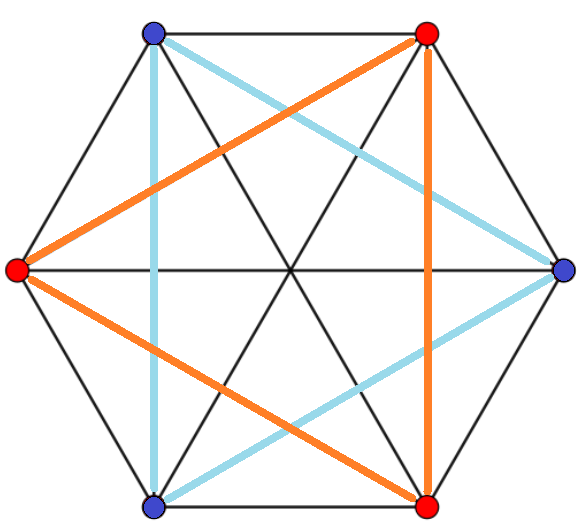
The orthogonal projection of a 3-3 duopyramid

The dual polyhedron of a 3-3 duoprism is called a 3-3 duopyramid or triangular duopyramid. It is also known as the cyclic polytope C(6,4). It has 9 tetragonal disphenoid cells, 18 triangular faces, 15 edges, and 6 vertices. It can be seen in orthogonal projection as a 6-gon circle of vertices, and edges connecting all pairs, just like a 5-simplex seen in projection.

The regular complex polygon _{2}{4}_{3}, also _{3}{ }+_{3}{ } has 6 vertices in $\mathbb{C}^2$ with a real representation in $\mathbb{R}^4$ matching the same vertex arrangement of the 3-3 duopyramid. It has 9 2-edges corresponding to the connecting edges of the 3-3 duopyramid, while the 6 edges connecting the two triangles are not included. It can be seen in a hexagonal projection with 3 sets of colored edges. This arrangement of vertices and edges makes a complete bipartite graph with each vertex from one triangle is connected to every vertex on the other. It is also called a Thomsen graph or 4-cage.

== See also ==
- 3-4 duoprism
- Tesseract (4-4 duoprism)
- Duocylinder
