= A5 polytope =

Orthographic projection in A_{5} Coxeter plane
5-simplex

In 5-dimensional geometry, there are 19 uniform polytopes with A_{5} symmetry. There is one self-dual regular form, the 5-simplex with 6 vertices.

Each can be visualized as symmetric orthographic projections in the Coxeter planes of the A_{5} Coxeter group and other subgroups.

== Graphs ==
Symmetric orthographic projections of these 19 polytopes can be made in the A_{5}, A_{4}, A_{3}, A_{2} Coxeter planes. A_{k} graphs have [k+1] symmetry. For even k and symmetrically nodea_1ed-diagrams, symmetry doubles to [2(k+1)].

These 19 polytopes are each shown in these 4 symmetry planes, with vertices and edges drawn and vertices colored by the number of overlapping vertices in each projective position.

#	Coxeter plane graphs				Coxeter-Dynkin diagram Schläfli symbol Name
#	[6]	[5]	[4]	[3]	Coxeter-Dynkin diagram Schläfli symbol Name
#	A_{5}	A_{4}	A_{3}	A_{2}	Coxeter-Dynkin diagram Schläfli symbol Name
1					{3,3,3,3} 5-simplex (hix)
2					t_{1}{3,3,3,3} or r{3,3,3,3} Rectified 5-simplex (rix)
3					t_{2}{3,3,3,3} or 2r{3,3,3,3} Birectified 5-simplex (dot)
4					t_{0,1}{3,3,3,3} or t{3,3,3,3} Truncated 5-simplex (tix)
5					t_{1,2}{3,3,3,3} or 2t{3,3,3,3} Bitruncated 5-simplex (bittix)
6					t_{0,2}{3,3,3,3} or rr{3,3,3,3} Cantellated 5-simplex (sarx)
7					t_{1,3}{3,3,3,3} or 2rr{3,3,3,3} Bicantellated 5-simplex (sibrid)
8					t_{0,3}{3,3,3,3} Runcinated 5-simplex (spix)
9					t_{0,4}{3,3,3,3} or 2r2r{3,3,3,3} Stericated 5-simplex (scad)
10					t_{0,1,2}{3,3,3,3} or tr{3,3,3,3} Cantitruncated 5-simplex (garx)
11					t_{1,2,3}{3,3,3,3} or 2tr{3,3,3,3} Bicantitruncated 5-simplex (gibrid)
12					t_{0,1,3}{3,3,3,3} Runcitruncated 5-simplex (pattix)
13					t_{0,2,3}{3,3,3,3} Runcicantellated 5-simplex (pirx)
14					t_{0,1,4}{3,3,3,3} Steritruncated 5-simplex (cappix)
15					t_{0,2,4}{3,3,3,3} Stericantellated 5-simplex (card)
16					t_{0,1,2,3}{3,3,3,3} Runcicantitruncated 5-simplex (gippix)
17					t_{0,1,2,4}{3,3,3,3} Stericantitruncated 5-simplex (cograx)
18					t_{0,1,3,4}{3,3,3,3} Steriruncitruncated 5-simplex (captid)
19					t_{0,1,2,3,4}{3,3,3,3} Omnitruncated 5-simplex (gocad)

A5 polytopes
t_{0}	t_{1}	t_{2}	t_{0,1}	t_{0,2}	t_{1,2}	t_{0,3}
t_{1,3}	t_{0,4}	t_{0,1,2}	t_{0,1,3}	t_{0,2,3}	t_{1,2,3}	t_{0,1,4}
t_{0,2,4}	t_{0,1,2,3}	t_{0,1,2,4}	t_{0,1,3,4}	t_{0,1,2,3,4}		

Fundamental convex regular and uniform polytopes in dimensions 2–10
Family	A_{n}	B_{n}	I_{2}(p) / D_{n}	E_{6} / E_{7} / E_{8} / F_{4} / G_{2}	H_{n}
Regular polygon	Triangle	Square	p-gon	Hexagon	Pentagon
Uniform polyhedron	Tetrahedron	Octahedron • Cube	Demicube		Dodecahedron • Icosahedron
Uniform polychoron	Pentachoron	16-cell • Tesseract	Demitesseract	24-cell	120-cell • 600-cell
Uniform 5-polytope	5-simplex	5-orthoplex • 5-cube	5-demicube		
Uniform 6-polytope	6-simplex	6-orthoplex • 6-cube	6-demicube	1_{22} • 2_{21}	
Uniform 7-polytope	7-simplex	7-orthoplex • 7-cube	7-demicube	1_{32} • 2_{31} • 3_{21}	
Uniform 8-polytope	8-simplex	8-orthoplex • 8-cube	8-demicube	1_{42} • 2_{41} • 4_{21}	
Uniform 9-polytope	9-simplex	9-orthoplex • 9-cube	9-demicube		
Uniform 10-polytope	10-simplex	10-orthoplex • 10-cube	10-demicube		
Uniform n-polytope	n-simplex	n-orthoplex • n-cube	n-demicube	1_{k2} • 2_{k1} • k_{21}	n-pentagonal polytope
Topics: Polytope families • Regular polytope • List of regular polytopes and compounds • Polytope operations
