= Runcinated 5-simplexes =

5-simplex	Runcinated 5-simplex	Runcitruncated 5-simplex
Birectified 5-simplex	Runcicantellated 5-simplex	Runcicantitruncated 5-simplex
Orthogonal projections in A_{5} Coxeter plane

In six-dimensional geometry, a runcinated 5-simplex is a convex uniform 5-polytope with 3rd order truncations (Runcination) of the regular 5-simplex.

There are 4 unique runcinations of the 5-simplex with permutations of truncations, and cantellations.

== Runcinated 5-simplex ==
Runcinated 5-simplex
Type	Uniform 5-polytope	
Schläfli symbol	t_{0,3}{3,3,3,3}	
Coxeter-Dynkin diagram		
4-faces	47	6 t_{0,3}{3,3,3} 20 {3}×{3} 15 { }×r{3,3} 6 r{3,3,3}
Cells	255	45 {3,3} 180 { }×{3} 30 r{3,3}
Faces	420	240 {3} 180 {4}
Edges	270	
Vertices	60	
Vertex figure		
Coxeter group	A_{5} [3,3,3,3], order 720	
Properties	convex	

=== Alternate names ===
- Runcinated hexateron
- Small prismated hexateron (Acronym: spix) (Jonathan Bowers)

=== Coordinates ===
The vertices of the runcinated 5-simplex can be most simply constructed on a hyperplane in 6-space as permutations of (0,0,1,1,1,2) or of (0,1,1,1,2,2), seen as facets of a runcinated 6-orthoplex, or a biruncinated 6-cube respectively.

=== Images ===
Orthographic projections
A_{k} Coxeter plane	A_{5}	A_{4}
Graph		
Dihedral symmetry	[6]	[5]
A_{k} Coxeter plane	A_{3}	A_{2}
Graph		
Dihedral symmetry	[4]	[3]

== Runcitruncated 5-simplex ==
Runcitruncated 5-simplex
Type	Uniform 5-polytope	
Schläfli symbol	t_{0,1,3}{3,3,3,3}	
Coxeter-Dynkin diagram		
4-faces	47	6 t_{0,1,3}{3,3,3} 20 {3}×{6} 15 { }×r{3,3} 6 rr{3,3,3}
Cells	315	
Faces	720	
Edges	630	
Vertices	180	
Vertex figure		
Coxeter group	A_{5} [3,3,3,3], order 720	
Properties	convex, isogonal	

=== Alternate names ===
- Runcitruncated hexateron
- Prismatotruncated hexateron (Acronym: pattix) (Jonathan Bowers)

=== Coordinates ===
The coordinates can be made in 6-space, as 180 permutations of:

(0,0,1,1,2,3)

This construction exists as one of 64 orthant facets of the runcitruncated 6-orthoplex.

=== Images ===
Orthographic projections
A_{k} Coxeter plane	A_{5}	A_{4}
Graph		
Dihedral symmetry	[6]	[5]
A_{k} Coxeter plane	A_{3}	A_{2}
Graph		
Dihedral symmetry	[4]	[3]

== Runcicantellated 5-simplex ==
Runcicantellated 5-simplex
Type	Uniform 5-polytope
Schläfli symbol	t_{0,2,3}{3,3,3,3}
Coxeter-Dynkin diagram	
4-faces	47
Cells	255
Faces	570
Edges	540
Vertices	180
Vertex figure	
Coxeter group	A_{5} [3,3,3,3], order 720
Properties	convex, isogonal

=== Alternate names ===
- Runcicantellated hexateron
- Biruncitruncated 5-simplex/hexateron
- Prismatorhombated hexateron (Acronym: pirx) (Jonathan Bowers)

=== Coordinates ===
The coordinates can be made in 6-space, as 180 permutations of:

(0,0,1,2,2,3)

This construction exists as one of 64 orthant facets of the runcicantellated 6-orthoplex.

=== Images ===
Orthographic projections
A_{k} Coxeter plane	A_{5}	A_{4}
Graph		
Dihedral symmetry	[6]	[5]
A_{k} Coxeter plane	A_{3}	A_{2}
Graph		
Dihedral symmetry	[4]	[3]

== Runcicantitruncated 5-simplex ==
Runcicantitruncated 5-simplex
Type	Uniform 5-polytope	
Schläfli symbol	t_{0,1,2,3}{3,3,3,3}	
Coxeter-Dynkin diagram		
4-faces	47	6 t_{0,1,2,3}{3,3,3} 20 {3}×{6} 15 {}×t{3,3} 6 tr{3,3,3}
Cells	315	45 t_{0,1,2}{3,3} 120 { }×{3} 120 { }×{6} 30 t{3,3}
Faces	810	120 {3} 450 {4} 240 {6}
Edges	900	
Vertices	360	
Vertex figure	Irregular 5-cell	
Coxeter group	A_{5} [3,3,3,3], order 720	
Properties	convex, isogonal	

=== Alternate names ===
- Runcicantitruncated hexateron
- Great prismated hexateron (Acronym: gippix) (Jonathan Bowers)

=== Coordinates ===
The coordinates can be made in 6-space, as 360 permutations of:

(0,0,1,2,3,4)

This construction exists as one of 64 orthant facets of the runcicantitruncated 6-orthoplex.

=== Images ===
Orthographic projections
A_{k} Coxeter plane	A_{5}	A_{4}
Graph		
Dihedral symmetry	[6]	[5]
A_{k} Coxeter plane	A_{3}	A_{2}
Graph		
Dihedral symmetry	[4]	[3]

== Related uniform 5-polytopes ==
These polytopes are in a set of 19 uniform 5-polytopes based on the [3,3,3,3] Coxeter group, all shown here in A_{5} Coxeter plane orthographic projections. (Vertices are colored by projection overlap order, red, orange, yellow, green, cyan, blue, purple having progressively more vertices)

A5 polytopes
t_{0}	t_{1}	t_{2}	t_{0,1}	t_{0,2}	t_{1,2}	t_{0,3}
t_{1,3}	t_{0,4}	t_{0,1,2}	t_{0,1,3}	t_{0,2,3}	t_{1,2,3}	t_{0,1,4}
t_{0,2,4}	t_{0,1,2,3}	t_{0,1,2,4}	t_{0,1,3,4}	t_{0,1,2,3,4}		

== Notes ==
Fundamental convex regular and uniform polytopes in dimensions 2–10
Family	A_{n}	B_{n}	I_{2}(p) / D_{n}	E_{6} / E_{7} / E_{8} / F_{4} / G_{2}	H_{n}
Regular polygon	Triangle	Square	p-gon	Hexagon	Pentagon
Uniform polyhedron	Tetrahedron	Octahedron • Cube	Demicube		Dodecahedron • Icosahedron
Uniform polychoron	Pentachoron	16-cell • Tesseract	Demitesseract	24-cell	120-cell • 600-cell
Uniform 5-polytope	5-simplex	5-orthoplex • 5-cube	5-demicube		
Uniform 6-polytope	6-simplex	6-orthoplex • 6-cube	6-demicube	1_{22} • 2_{21}	
Uniform 7-polytope	7-simplex	7-orthoplex • 7-cube	7-demicube	1_{32} • 2_{31} • 3_{21}	
Uniform 8-polytope	8-simplex	8-orthoplex • 8-cube	8-demicube	1_{42} • 2_{41} • 4_{21}	
Uniform 9-polytope	9-simplex	9-orthoplex • 9-cube	9-demicube		
Uniform 10-polytope	10-simplex	10-orthoplex • 10-cube	10-demicube		
Uniform n-polytope	n-simplex	n-orthoplex • n-cube	n-demicube	1_{k2} • 2_{k1} • k_{21}	n-pentagonal polytope
Topics: Polytope families • Regular polytope • List of regular polytopes and compounds • Polytope operations
