= Stericated 5-simplexes =

5-simplex	Stericated 5-simplex
Steritruncated 5-simplex	Stericantellated 5-simplex
Stericantitruncated 5-simplex	Steriruncitruncated 5-simplex
Steriruncicantitruncated 5-simplex (Omnitruncated 5-simplex)
Orthogonal projections in A_{5} and A_{4} Coxeter planes

In five-dimensional geometry, a stericated 5-simplex is a convex uniform 5-polytope with fourth-order truncations (sterication) of the regular 5-simplex.

There are six unique sterications of the 5-simplex, including permutations of truncations, cantellations, and runcinations. The simplest stericated 5-simplex is also called an expanded 5-simplex, with the first and last nodes ringed, for being constructible by an expansion operation applied to the regular 5-simplex. The highest form, the steriruncicantitruncated 5-simplex is more simply called an omnitruncated 5-simplex with all of the nodes ringed.

== Stericated 5-simplex ==
Stericated 5-simplex
Type	Uniform 5-polytope	
Schläfli symbol	2r2r{3,3,3,3} 2r{3^{2,2}} = $2r\left\{\begin{array}{l}3, 3\\3 ,3\end{array}\right\}$	
Coxeter-Dynkin diagram	or	
4-faces	62	6+6 {3,3,3} 15+15 {}×{3,3} 20 {3}×{3}
Cells	180	60 {3,3} 120 {}×{3}
Faces	210	120 {3} 90 {4}
Edges	120	
Vertices	30	
Vertex figure	Tetrahedral antiprism	
Coxeter group	A_{5}×2, [[3,3,3,3]], order 1440	
Properties	convex, isogonal, isotoxal	

A stericated 5-simplex can be constructed by an expansion operation applied to the regular 5-simplex, and thus is also sometimes called an expanded 5-simplex. It has 30 vertices, 120 edges, 210 faces (120 triangles and 90 squares), 180 cells (60 tetrahedra and 120 triangular prisms) and 62 4-faces (12 5-cells, 30 tetrahedral prisms and 20 3-3 duoprisms).

=== Alternate names ===
- Expanded 5-simplex
- Stericated hexateron
- Small cellated dodecateron (Acronym: scad) (Jonathan Bowers)

=== Cross-sections ===
The maximal cross-section of the stericated hexateron with a 4-dimensional hyperplane is a runcinated 5-cell. This cross-section divides the stericated hexateron into two pentachoral hypercupolas consisting of 6 5-cells, 15 tetrahedral prisms and 10 3-3 duoprisms each.

=== Coordinates ===
The vertices of the stericated 5-simplex can be constructed on a hyperplane in 6-space as permutations of (0,1,1,1,1,2). This represents the positive orthant facet of the stericated 6-orthoplex.

A second construction in 6-space, from the center of a rectified 6-orthoplex is given by coordinate permutations of:

(1,-1,0,0,0,0)

The Cartesian coordinates in 5-space for the normalized vertices of an origin-centered stericated hexateron are:

$$\left(\pm1,\ 0,\ 0,\ 0,\ 0\right)$$
$$\left(0,\ \pm1,\ 0,\ 0,\ 0\right)$$
$$\left(0,\ 0,\ \pm1,\ 0,\ 0\right)$$
$$\left(\pm1/2,\      0,\ \pm1/2,\ -\sqrt{1/8},\ -\sqrt{3/8}\right)$$
$$\left(\pm1/2,\      0,\ \pm1/2,\  \sqrt{1/8},\  \sqrt{3/8}\right)$$
$$\left(     0,\ \pm1/2,\ \pm1/2,\ -\sqrt{1/8},\  \sqrt{3/8}\right)$$
$$\left(     0,\ \pm1/2,\ \pm1/2,\  \sqrt{1/8},\ -\sqrt{3/8}\right)$$
$$\left(\pm1/2,\ \pm1/2,\ 0,\ \pm\sqrt{1/2},\ 0\right)$$

=== Root system ===
Its 30 vertices represent the root vectors of the simple Lie group A_{5}. It is also the vertex figure of the 5-simplex honeycomb.

=== Images ===
Orthographic projections
A_{k} Coxeter plane	A_{5}	A_{4}
Graph		
Dihedral symmetry	[6]	[[5]]=[10]
A_{k} Coxeter plane	A_{3}	A_{2}
Graph		
Dihedral symmetry	[4]	[[3]]=[6]

Orthogonal projection with [6] symmetry

== Steritruncated 5-simplex ==
Steritruncated 5-simplex
Type	Uniform 5-polytope	
Schläfli symbol	t_{0,1,4}{3,3,3,3}	
Coxeter-Dynkin diagram		
4-faces	62	6 t{3,3,3} 15 {}×t{3,3} 20 {3}×{6} 15 {}×{3,3} 6 t_{0,3}{3,3,3}
Cells	330	
Faces	570	
Edges	420	
Vertices	120	
Vertex figure		
Coxeter group	A_{5} [3,3,3,3], order 720	
Properties	convex, isogonal	

=== Alternate names ===
- Steritruncated hexateron
- Celliprismated hexateron (Acronym: cappix) (Jonathan Bowers)

=== Coordinates ===
The coordinates can be made in 6-space, as 180 permutations of:

(0,1,1,1,2,3)

This construction exists as one of 64 orthant facets of the steritruncated 6-orthoplex.

=== Images ===
Orthographic projections
A_{k} Coxeter plane	A_{5}	A_{4}
Graph		
Dihedral symmetry	[6]	[5]
A_{k} Coxeter plane	A_{3}	A_{2}
Graph		
Dihedral symmetry	[4]	[3]

== Stericantellated 5-simplex ==
Stericantellated 5-simplex
Type	Uniform 5-polytope	
Schläfli symbol	t_{0,2,4}{3,3,3,3}	
Coxeter-Dynkin diagram	or	
4-faces	62	12 rr{3,3,3} 30 rr{3,3}x{} 20 {3}×{3}
Cells	420	60 rr{3,3} 240 {}×{3} 90 {}×{}×{} 30 r{3,3}
Faces	900	360 {3} 540 {4}
Edges	720	
Vertices	180	
Vertex figure		
Coxeter group	A_{5}×2, [[3,3,3,3]], order 1440	
Properties	convex, isogonal	

=== Alternate names ===
- Stericantellated hexateron
- Cellirhombated dodecateron (Acronym: card) (Jonathan Bowers)

=== Coordinates ===
The coordinates can be made in 6-space, as permutations of:

(0,1,1,2,2,3)

This construction exists as one of 64 orthant facets of the stericantellated 6-orthoplex.

=== Images ===
Orthographic projections
A_{k} Coxeter plane	A_{5}	A_{4}
Graph		
Dihedral symmetry	[6]	[[5]]=[10]
A_{k} Coxeter plane	A_{3}	A_{2}
Graph		
Dihedral symmetry	[4]	[[3]]=[6]

== Stericantitruncated 5-simplex ==
Stericantitruncated 5-simplex
Type	Uniform 5-polytope
Schläfli symbol	t_{0,1,2,4}{3,3,3,3}
Coxeter-Dynkin diagram	
4-faces	62
Cells	480
Faces	1140
Edges	1080
Vertices	360
Vertex figure	
Coxeter group	A_{5} [3,3,3,3], order 720
Properties	convex, isogonal

=== Alternate names ===
- Stericantitruncated hexateron
- Celligreatorhombated hexateron (Acronym: cograx) (Jonathan Bowers)

=== Coordinates ===
The coordinates can be made in 6-space, as 360 permutations of:

(0,1,1,2,3,4)

This construction exists as one of 64 orthant facets of the stericantitruncated 6-orthoplex.

=== Images ===
Orthographic projections
A_{k} Coxeter plane	A_{5}	A_{4}
Graph		
Dihedral symmetry	[6]	[5]
A_{k} Coxeter plane	A_{3}	A_{2}
Graph		
Dihedral symmetry	[4]	[3]

== Steriruncitruncated 5-simplex ==
Steriruncitruncated 5-simplex
Type	Uniform 5-polytope	
Schläfli symbol	t_{0,1,3,4}{3,3,3,3} 2t{3^{2,2}}	
Coxeter-Dynkin diagram	or	
4-faces	62	12 t_{0,1,3}{3,3,3} 30 {}×t{3,3} 20 {6}×{6}
Cells	450	
Faces	1110	
Edges	1080	
Vertices	360	
Vertex figure		
Coxeter group	A_{5}×2, [[3,3,3,3]], order 1440	
Properties	convex, isogonal	

=== Alternate names ===
- Steriruncitruncated hexateron
- Celliprismatotruncated dodecateron (Acronym: captid) (Jonathan Bowers)

=== Coordinates ===
The coordinates can be made in 6-space, as 360 permutations of:

(0,1,2,2,3,4)

This construction exists as one of 64 orthant facets of the steriruncitruncated 6-orthoplex.

=== Images ===
Orthographic projections
A_{k} Coxeter plane	A_{5}	A_{4}
Graph		
Dihedral symmetry	[6]	[[5]]=[10]
A_{k} Coxeter plane	A_{3}	A_{2}
Graph		
Dihedral symmetry	[4]	[[3]]=[6]

== Omnitruncated 5-simplex ==
Omnitruncated 5-simplex
Type	Uniform 5-polytope	
Schläfli symbol	t_{0,1,2,3,4}{3,3,3,3} 2tr{3^{2,2}}	
Coxeter-Dynkin diagram	or	
4-faces	62	12 t_{0,1,2,3}{3,3,3} 30 {}×tr{3,3} 20 {6}×{6}
Cells	540	360 t{3,4} 90 {4,3} 90 {}×{6}
Faces	1560	480 {6} 1080 {4}
Edges	1800	
Vertices	720	
Vertex figure	Irregular 5-cell	
Coxeter group	A_{5}×2, [[3,3,3,3]], order 1440	
Properties	convex, isogonal, zonotope	

The omnitruncated 5-simplex has 720 vertices, 1800 edges, 1560 faces (480 hexagons and 1080 squares), 540 cells (360 truncated octahedra, 90 cubes, and 90 hexagonal prisms), and 62 4-faces (12 omnitruncated 5-cells, 30 truncated octahedral prisms, and 20 6-6 duoprisms).

=== Alternate names ===
- Steriruncicantitruncated 5-simplex (Full description of omnitruncation for 5-polytopes by Johnson)
- Omnitruncated hexateron
- Great cellated dodecateron (Acronym: gocad) (Jonathan Bowers)

=== Coordinates ===
The vertices of the omnitruncated 5-simplex can be most simply constructed on a hyperplane in 6-space as permutations of (0,1,2,3,4,5). These coordinates come from the positive orthant facet of the steriruncicantitruncated 6-orthoplex, t_{0,1,2,3,4}{3^{4},4},.

=== Images ===
Orthographic projections
A_{k} Coxeter plane	A_{5}	A_{4}
Graph		
Dihedral symmetry	[6]	[[5]]=[10]
A_{k} Coxeter plane	A_{3}	A_{2}
Graph		
Dihedral symmetry	[4]	[[3]]=[6]

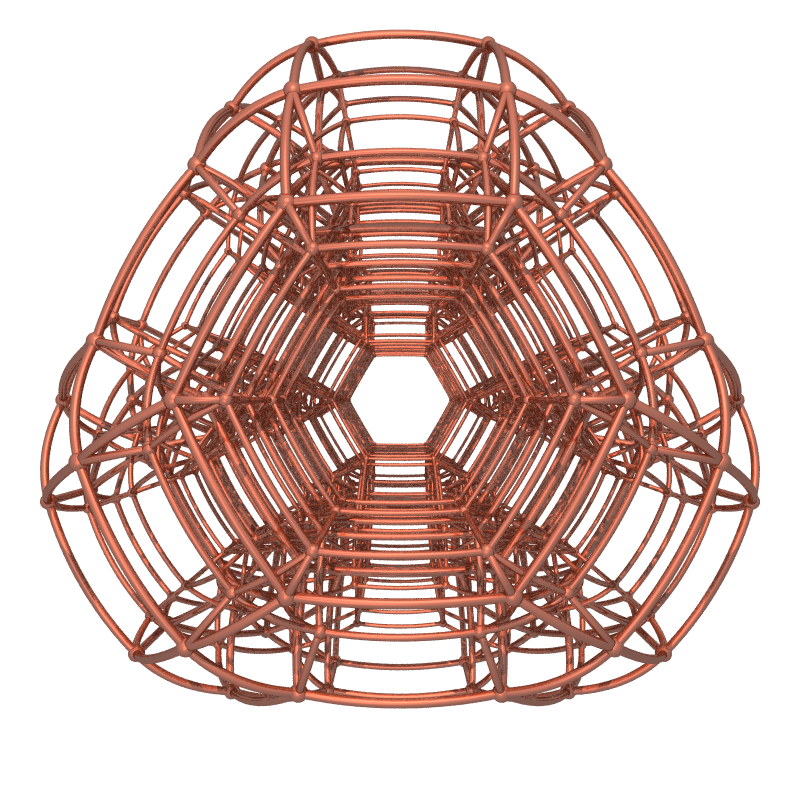
Stereographic projection

=== Permutohedron ===
The omnitruncated 5-simplex is the permutohedron of order 6. It is also a zonotope, the Minkowski sum of six line segments parallel to the six lines through the origin and the six vertices of the 5-simplex.

Orthogonal projection, vertices labeled as a permutohedron.

=== Related honeycomb ===
The omnitruncated 5-simplex honeycomb is constructed by omnitruncated 5-simplex facets with 3 facets around each ridge. It has Coxeter-Dynkin diagram of.

Coxeter group	${\tilde{I}}_{1}$	${\tilde{A}}_{2}$	${\tilde{A}}_{3}$	${\tilde{A}}_{4}$	${\tilde{A}}_{5}$
Coxeter-Dynkin					
Picture					
Name	Apeirogon	Hextille	Omnitruncated; 3-simplex honeycomb	Omnitruncated; 4-simplex honeycomb	Omnitruncated; 5-simplex honeycomb
Facets					

=== Full snub 5-simplex ===
The full snub 5-simplex or omnisnub 5-simplex, defined as an alternation of the omnitruncated 5-simplex is not uniform, but it can be given Coxeter diagram and symmetry [[3,3,3,3]]^{+}, and constructed from 12 snub 5-cells, 30 snub tetrahedral antiprisms, 20 3-3 duoantiprisms, and 360 irregular 5-cells filling the gaps at the deleted vertices.

== Related uniform polytopes ==
These polytopes are a part of 19 uniform 5-polytopes based on the [3,3,3,3] Coxeter group, all shown here in A_{5} Coxeter plane orthographic projections. (Vertices are colored by projection overlap order, red, orange, yellow, green, cyan, blue, purple, magenta having progressively more vertices)

A5 polytopes
t_{0}	t_{1}	t_{2}	t_{0,1}	t_{0,2}	t_{1,2}	t_{0,3}
t_{1,3}	t_{0,4}	t_{0,1,2}	t_{0,1,3}	t_{0,2,3}	t_{1,2,3}	t_{0,1,4}
t_{0,2,4}	t_{0,1,2,3}	t_{0,1,2,4}	t_{0,1,3,4}	t_{0,1,2,3,4}		

== Notes ==
Fundamental convex regular and uniform polytopes
Family	A_{n}	B_{n}	I_{2}(p) / D_{n}	E_{6} / E_{7} / E_{8} / F_{4} / G_{2}	H_{n}
Regular polygon	Triangle	Square	p-gon	Hexagon	Pentagon
Uniform polyhedron	Tetrahedron	Octahedron • Cube	Demicube		Dodecahedron • Icosahedron
Uniform polychoron	Pentachoron	16-cell • Tesseract	Demitesseract	24-cell	120-cell • 600-cell
Uniform 5-polytope	5-simplex	5-orthoplex • 5-cube	5-demicube		
Uniform 6-polytope	6-simplex	6-orthoplex • 6-cube	6-demicube	1_{22} • 2_{21}	
Uniform 7-polytope	7-simplex	7-orthoplex • 7-cube	7-demicube	1_{32} • 2_{31} • 3_{21}	
Uniform 8-polytope	8-simplex	8-orthoplex • 8-cube	8-demicube	1_{42} • 2_{41} • 4_{21}	
Uniform n-polytope	n-simplex	n-orthoplex • n-cube	n-demicube	1_{k2} • 2_{k1} • k_{21}	n-pentagonal polytope
Topics: Polytope families • Regular polytope • List of regular polytopes and compounds • Polytope operations
