= E8 polytope =

Orthographic projections in the E_{8} Coxeter plane
| 4_{21} | 2_{41} | 1_{42} |

In 8-dimensional geometry, there are 255 uniform polytopes with E_{8} symmetry. The three simplest forms are the 4_{21}, 2_{41}, and 1_{42} polytopes, composed of 240, 2160 and 17280 vertices respectively.

These polytopes can be visualized as symmetric orthographic projections in Coxeter planes of the E_{8} Coxeter group, and other subgroups.

== Graphs ==
Symmetric orthographic projections of these 255 polytopes can be made in the E_{8}, E_{7}, E_{6}, D_{7}, D_{6}, D_{5}, D_{4}, D_{3}, A_{7}, A_{5} Coxeter planes. A_{k} has [k+1] symmetry, D_{k} has [2(k-1)] symmetry, and E_{6}, E_{7}, E_{8} have [12], [18], [30] symmetry respectively. In addition there are two other degrees of fundamental invariants, order [20] and [24] for the E_{8} group that represent Coxeter planes.

11 of these 255 polytopes are shown in 15 symmetry planes, with vertices and edges drawn, and vertices colored by the number of overlapping vertices in each projective position in progressive order: red, orange, yellow, green, cyan, blue, purple, magenta, red-violet.

| # | Coxeter plane projections | | | | | | | | | | | | | | | Coxeter-Dynkin diagram Name |
| # | E_{8} [30] | E_{7} [18] | E_{6} [12] | [24] | [20] | D_{4}-E_{6} [6] | A_{3} D_{3} [4] | A_{2} D_{4} [6] | D_{5} [8] | A_{4} D_{6} [10] | D_{7} [12] | A_{6} B_{7} [14] | B_{8} [16/2] | A_{5} [6] | A_{7} [8] | Coxeter-Dynkin diagram Name |
|---|---|---|---|---|---|---|---|---|---|---|---|---|---|---|---|---|
| 1 | | | | | | | | | | | | | | | | 4_{21} (fy) |
| 2 | | | | | | | | | | | | | | | | Rectified 4_{21} (riffy) |
| 3 | | | | | | | | | | | | | | | | Birectified 4_{21} (borfy) |
| 4 | | | | | | | | | | | | | | | | Trirectified 4_{21} (torfy) |
| 5 | | | | | | | | | | | | | | | | Rectified 1_{42} (buffy) |
| 6 | | | | | | | | | | | | | | | | Rectified 2_{41} (robay) |
| 7 | | | | | | | | | | | | | | | | 2_{41} (bay) |
| 8 | | | | | | | | | | | | | | | | Truncated 2_{41} |
| 9 | | | | | | | | | | | | | | | | Truncated 4_{21} (tiffy) |
| 10 | | | | | | | | | | | | | | | | 1_{42} (bif) |
| 11 | | | | | | | | | | | | | | | | Truncated 1_{42} |

Fundamental convex regular and uniform polytopes in dimensions 2–10
| Family | A_{n} | B_{n} | I_{2}(p) / D_{n} | E_{6} / E_{7} / E_{8} / F_{4} / G_{2} | H_{n} |
| Regular polygon | Triangle | Square | p-gon | Hexagon | Pentagon |
| Uniform polyhedron | Tetrahedron | Octahedron • Cube | Demicube | | Dodecahedron • Icosahedron |
| Uniform polychoron | Pentachoron | 16-cell • Tesseract | Demitesseract | 24-cell | 120-cell • 600-cell |
| Uniform 5-polytope | 5-simplex | 5-orthoplex • 5-cube | 5-demicube | | |
| Uniform 6-polytope | 6-simplex | 6-orthoplex • 6-cube | 6-demicube | 1_{22} • 2_{21} | |
| Uniform 7-polytope | 7-simplex | 7-orthoplex • 7-cube | 7-demicube | 1_{32} • 2_{31} • 3_{21} | |
| Uniform 8-polytope | 8-simplex | 8-orthoplex • 8-cube | 8-demicube | 1_{42} • 2_{41} • 4_{21} | |
| Uniform 9-polytope | 9-simplex | 9-orthoplex • 9-cube | 9-demicube | | |
| Uniform 10-polytope | 10-simplex | 10-orthoplex • 10-cube | 10-demicube | | |
| Uniform n-polytope | n-simplex | n-orthoplex • n-cube | n-demicube | 1_{k2} • 2_{k1} • k_{21} | n-pentagonal polytope |
Topics: Polytope families • Regular polytope • List of regular polytopes and compounds • Polytope operations
