= Cantellated 5-simplexes =

5-simplex	Cantellated 5-simplex	Bicantellated 5-simplex
Birectified 5-simplex	Cantitruncated 5-simplex	Bicantitruncated 5-simplex
Orthogonal projections in A_{5} Coxeter plane

In five-dimensional geometry, a cantellated 5-simplex is a convex uniform 5-polytope, being a cantellation of the regular 5-simplex.

There are unique 4 degrees of cantellation for the 5-simplex, including truncations.

== Cantellated 5-simplex ==
Cantellated 5-simplex
Type	Uniform 5-polytope	
Schläfli symbol	rr{3,3,3,3} = $r\left\{\begin{array}{l}3, 3, 3\\3\end{array}\right\}$	
Coxeter-Dynkin diagram	or	
4-faces	27	6 r{3,3,3} 6 rr{3,3,3} 15 {}x{3,3}
Cells	135	30 {3,3} 30 r{3,3} 15 rr{3,3} 60 {}x{3}
Faces	290	200 {3} 90 {4}
Edges	240	
Vertices	60	
Vertex figure	Tetrahedral prism	
Coxeter group	A_{5} [3,3,3,3], order 720	
Properties	convex	

The cantellated 5-simplex has 60 vertices, 240 edges, 290 faces (200 triangles and 90 squares), 135 cells (30 tetrahedra, 30 octahedra, 15 cuboctahedra and 60 triangular prisms), and 27 4-faces (6 cantellated 5-cell, 6 rectified 5-cells, and 15 tetrahedral prisms).

=== Alternate names ===
- Cantellated hexateron
- Small rhombated hexateron (Acronym: sarx) (Jonathan Bowers)

=== Coordinates ===
The vertices of the cantellated 5-simplex can be most simply constructed on a hyperplane in 6-space as permutations of (0,0,0,1,1,2) or of (0,1,1,2,2,2). These represent positive orthant facets of the cantellated hexacross and bicantellated hexeract respectively.

=== Images ===
Orthographic projections
A_{k} Coxeter plane	A_{5}	A_{4}
Graph		
Dihedral symmetry	[6]	[5]
A_{k} Coxeter plane	A_{3}	A_{2}
Graph		
Dihedral symmetry	[4]	[3]

== Bicantellated 5-simplex ==
Bicantellated 5-simplex
Type	Uniform 5-polytope	
Schläfli symbol	2rr{3,3,3,3} = $r\left\{\begin{array}{l}3, 3\\3 ,3\end{array}\right\}$	
Coxeter-Dynkin diagram	or	
4-faces	32	12 t02{3,3,3} 20 {3}x{3}
Cells	180	30 t1{3,3} 120 {}x{3} 30 t02{3,3}
Faces	420	240 {3} 180 {4}
Edges	360	
Vertices	90	
Vertex figure		
Coxeter group	A_{5}×2, [[3,3,3,3]], order 1440	
Properties	convex, isogonal	

=== Alternate names ===
- Bicantellated hexateron
- Small birhombated dodecateron (Acronym: sibrid) (Jonathan Bowers)

=== Coordinates ===
The coordinates can be made in 6-space, as 90 permutations of:

(0,0,1,1,2,2)

This construction exists as one of 64 orthant facets of the bicantellated 6-orthoplex.

=== Images ===
Orthographic projections
A_{k} Coxeter plane	A_{5}	A_{4}
Graph		
Dihedral symmetry	[6]	[[5]]=[10]
A_{k} Coxeter plane	A_{3}	A_{2}
Graph		
Dihedral symmetry	[4]	[[3]]=[6]

== Cantitruncated 5-simplex ==
Cantitruncated 5-simplex
Type	Uniform 5-polytope	
Schläfli symbol	tr{3,3,3,3} = $t\left\{\begin{array}{l}3, 3, 3\\3\end{array}\right\}$	
Coxeter-Dynkin diagram	or	
4-faces	27	6 t012{3,3,3} 6 t{3,3,3} 15 {}x{3,3}
Cells	135	15 t012{3,3} 30 t{3,3} 60 {}x{3} 30 {3,3}
Faces	290	120 {3} 80 {6} 90 {}x{}
Edges	300	
Vertices	120	
Vertex figure	Irr. 5-cell	
Coxeter group	A_{5} [3,3,3,3], order 720	
Properties	convex	

=== Alternate names ===
- Cantitruncated hexateron
- Great rhombated hexateron (Acronym: garx) (Jonathan Bowers)

=== Coordinates ===
The vertices of the cantitruncated 5-simplex can be most simply constructed on a hyperplane in 6-space as permutations of (0,0,0,1,2,3) or of (0,1,2,3,3,3). These construction can be seen as facets of the cantitruncated 6-orthoplex or bicantitruncated 6-cube respectively.

=== Images ===
Orthographic projections
A_{k} Coxeter plane	A_{5}	A_{4}
Graph		
Dihedral symmetry	[6]	[5]
A_{k} Coxeter plane	A_{3}	A_{2}
Graph		
Dihedral symmetry	[4]	[3]

== Bicantitruncated 5-simplex ==
Bicantitruncated 5-simplex
Type	Uniform 5-polytope	
Schläfli symbol	2tr{3,3,3,3} = $t\left\{\begin{array}{l}3, 3\\3 ,3\end{array}\right\}$	
Coxeter-Dynkin diagram	or	
4-faces	32	12 tr{3,3,3} 20 {3}x{3}
Cells	180	30 t{3,3} 120 {}x{3} 30 t{3,4}
Faces	420	240 {3} 180 {4}
Edges	450	
Vertices	180	
Vertex figure		
Coxeter group	A_{5}×2, [[3,3,3,3]], order 1440	
Properties	convex, isogonal	

=== Alternate names ===
- Bicantitruncated hexateron
- Great birhombated dodecateron(Acronym: gibrid) (Jonathan Bowers)

=== Coordinates ===
The coordinates can be made in 6-space, as 180 permutations of:

(0,0,1,2,3,3)

This construction exists as one of 64 orthant facets of the bicantitruncated 6-orthoplex.

=== Images ===
Orthographic projections
A_{k} Coxeter plane	A_{5}	A_{4}
Graph		
Dihedral symmetry	[6]	[[5]]=[10]
A_{k} Coxeter plane	A_{3}	A_{2}
Graph		
Dihedral symmetry	[4]	[[3]]=[6]

== Related uniform 5-polytopes ==
The cantellated 5-simplex, sarx, as well as sibrid, garx, and gibrid are in a set of 19 uniform 5-polytopes based on the [3,3,3,3] Coxeter group, all shown here in A_{5} Coxeter plane orthographic projections. (Vertices are colored by projection overlap order, red, orange, yellow, green, cyan, blue, purple having progressively more vertices)

A5 polytopes
t_{0}	t_{1}	t_{2}	t_{0,1}	t_{0,2}	t_{1,2}	t_{0,3}
t_{1,3}	t_{0,4}	t_{0,1,2}	t_{0,1,3}	t_{0,2,3}	t_{1,2,3}	t_{0,1,4}
t_{0,2,4}	t_{0,1,2,3}	t_{0,1,2,4}	t_{0,1,3,4}	t_{0,1,2,3,4}		

== Notes ==
Fundamental convex regular and uniform polytopes in dimensions 2–10
Family	A_{n}	B_{n}	I_{2}(p) / D_{n}	E_{6} / E_{7} / E_{8} / F_{4} / G_{2}	H_{n}
Regular polygon	Triangle	Square	p-gon	Hexagon	Pentagon
Uniform polyhedron	Tetrahedron	Octahedron • Cube	Demicube		Dodecahedron • Icosahedron
Uniform polychoron	Pentachoron	16-cell • Tesseract	Demitesseract	24-cell	120-cell • 600-cell
Uniform 5-polytope	5-simplex	5-orthoplex • 5-cube	5-demicube		
Uniform 6-polytope	6-simplex	6-orthoplex • 6-cube	6-demicube	1_{22} • 2_{21}	
Uniform 7-polytope	7-simplex	7-orthoplex • 7-cube	7-demicube	1_{32} • 2_{31} • 3_{21}	
Uniform 8-polytope	8-simplex	8-orthoplex • 8-cube	8-demicube	1_{42} • 2_{41} • 4_{21}	
Uniform 9-polytope	9-simplex	9-orthoplex • 9-cube	9-demicube		
Uniform 10-polytope	10-simplex	10-orthoplex • 10-cube	10-demicube		
Uniform n-polytope	n-simplex	n-orthoplex • n-cube	n-demicube	1_{k2} • 2_{k1} • k_{21}	n-pentagonal polytope
Topics: Polytope families • Regular polytope • List of regular polytopes and compounds • Polytope operations
