= A4 polytope =

Orthographic projection in A_{4} Coxeter plane
5-cell

In 4-dimensional geometry, there are 9 uniform polytopes with A_{4} symmetry. There is one self-dual regular form, the 5-cell with 5 vertices.

== Symmetry ==
A_{4} symmetry, or [3,3,3] is order 120, with Conway quaternion notation +^{1}/_{60}[I×I̅].2_{1}. Its abstract structure is the symmetric group S_{5}. Three forms with symmetric Coxeter diagrams have extended symmetry, [[3,3,3]] of order 240, and Conway notation ±^{1}/_{60}[I×I̅].2, and abstract structure S_{5}×C_{2}.

== Visualizations ==
Each can be visualized as symmetric orthographic projections in Coxeter planes of the A_{4} Coxeter group, and other subgroups. Three Coxeter plane 2D projections are given, for the A_{4}, A_{3}, A_{2} Coxeter groups, showing symmetry order 5,4,3, and doubled on even A_{k} orders to 10,4,6 for symmetric Coxeter diagrams.

The 3D picture are drawn as Schlegel diagram projections, centered on the cell at pos. 3, with a consistent orientation, and the 5 cells at position 0 are shown solid.

Uniform polytopes with A_{4} symmetry
#	Name	Coxeter diagram and Schläfli symbols	Coxeter plane graphs			Schlegel diagram		Net
#	Name	Coxeter diagram and Schläfli symbols	A_{4} [5]	A_{3} [4]	A_{2} [3]	Tetrahedron centered	Dual tetrahedron centered	Net
1	5-cell pentachoron	{3,3,3}						
2	rectified 5-cell	r{3,3,3}						
3	truncated 5-cell	t{3,3,3}						
4	cantellated 5-cell	rr{3,3,3}						
7	cantitruncated 5-cell	tr{3,3,3}						
8	runcitruncated 5-cell	t_{0,1,3}{3,3,3}						

Uniform polytopes with extended A_{4} symmetry
#	Name	Coxeter diagram and Schläfli symbols	Coxeter plane graphs			Schlegel diagram	Net
#	Name	Coxeter diagram and Schläfli symbols	A_{4} [[5]] = [10]	A_{3} [4]	A_{2} [[3]] = [6]	Tetrahedron centered	Net
5	*runcinated 5-cell	t_{0,3}{3,3,3}					
6	*bitruncated 5-cell decachoron	2t{3,3,3}					
9	*omnitruncated 5-cell	t_{0,1,2,3}{3,3,3}					

== Coordinates ==
The coordinates of uniform 4-polytopes with pentachoric symmetry can be generated as permutations of simple integers in 5-space, all in hyperplanes with normal vector (1,1,1,1,1). The A_{4} Coxeter group is palindromic, so repeated polytopes exist in pairs of dual configurations. There are 3 symmetric positions, and 6 pairs making the total 15 permutations of one or more rings. All 15 are listed here in order of binary arithmetic for clarity of the coordinate generation from the rings in each corresponding Coxeter diagram.

The number of vertices can be deduced here from the permutations of the number of coordinates, peaking at 5 factorial for the omnitruncated form with 5 unique coordinate values.

5-cell truncations in 5-space:
#	Base point	Name (symmetric name)	Coxeter diagram	Vertices	
1	(0, 0, 0, 0, 1) (1, 1, 1, 1, 0)	5-cell Trirectified 5-cell		5	5!/(4!)
2	(0, 0, 0, 1, 1) (1, 1, 1, 0, 0)	Rectified 5-cell Birectified 5-cell		10	5!/(3!2!)
3	(0, 0, 0, 1, 2) (2, 2, 2, 1, 0)	Truncated 5-cell Tritruncated 5-cell		20	5!/(3!)
5	(0, 1, 1, 1, 2)	Runcinated 5-cell		20	5!/(3!)
4	(0, 0, 1, 1, 2) (2, 2, 1, 1, 0)	Cantellated 5-cell Bicantellated 5-cell		30	5!/(2!2!)
6	(0, 0, 1, 2, 2)	Bitruncated 5-cell		30	5!/(2!2!)
7	(0, 0, 1, 2, 3) (3, 3, 2, 1, 0)	Cantitruncated 5-cell Bicantitruncated 5-cell		60	5!/2!
8	(0, 1, 1, 2, 3) (3, 2, 2, 1, 0)	Runcitruncated 5-cell Runcicantellated 5-cell		60	5!/2!
9	(0, 1, 2, 3, 4)	Omnitruncated 5-cell		120	5!

Fundamental convex regular and uniform polytopes in dimensions 2–10
Family	A_{n}	B_{n}	I_{2}(p) / D_{n}	E_{6} / E_{7} / E_{8} / F_{4} / G_{2}	H_{n}
Regular polygon	Triangle	Square	p-gon	Hexagon	Pentagon
Uniform polyhedron	Tetrahedron	Octahedron • Cube	Demicube		Dodecahedron • Icosahedron
Uniform polychoron	Pentachoron	16-cell • Tesseract	Demitesseract	24-cell	120-cell • 600-cell
Uniform 5-polytope	5-simplex	5-orthoplex • 5-cube	5-demicube		
Uniform 6-polytope	6-simplex	6-orthoplex • 6-cube	6-demicube	1_{22} • 2_{21}	
Uniform 7-polytope	7-simplex	7-orthoplex • 7-cube	7-demicube	1_{32} • 2_{31} • 3_{21}	
Uniform 8-polytope	8-simplex	8-orthoplex • 8-cube	8-demicube	1_{42} • 2_{41} • 4_{21}	
Uniform 9-polytope	9-simplex	9-orthoplex • 9-cube	9-demicube		
Uniform 10-polytope	10-simplex	10-orthoplex • 10-cube	10-demicube		
Uniform n-polytope	n-simplex	n-orthoplex • n-cube	n-demicube	1_{k2} • 2_{k1} • k_{21}	n-pentagonal polytope
Topics: Polytope families • Regular polytope • List of regular polytopes and compounds • Polytope operations
