= Rectified 5-simplexes =

5-simplex	Rectified 5-simplex	Birectified 5-simplex
Orthogonal projections in A_{5} Coxeter plane

In five-dimensional geometry, a rectified 5-simplex is a convex uniform 5-polytope, being a rectification of the regular 5-simplex.

There are three unique degrees of rectifications, including the zeroth, the 5-simplex itself. Vertices of the rectified 5-simplex are located at the edge-centers of the 5-simplex. Vertices of the birectified 5-simplex are located in the triangular face centers of the 5-simplex.

== Rectified 5-simplex ==
Rectified 5-simplex Rectified hexateron (rix)
Type	uniform 5-polytope	
Schläfli symbol	r{3^{4}} or $\left\{\begin{array}{l}3, 3, 3\\3\end{array}\right\}$	
Coxeter diagram	or	
4-faces	12	6 {3,3,3} 6 r{3,3,3}
Cells	45	15 {3,3} 30 r{3,3}
Faces	80	80 {3}
Edges	60	
Vertices	15	
Vertex figure	{}×{3,3}	
Coxeter group	A_{5}, [3^{4}], order 720	
Dual		
Base point	(0,0,0,0,1,1)	
Circumradius	0.645497	
Properties	convex, isogonal isotoxal	

In five-dimensional geometry, a rectified 5-simplex is a uniform 5-polytope with 15 vertices, 60 edges, 80 triangular faces, 45 cells (30 tetrahedral, and 15 octahedral), and 12 4-faces (6 5-cell and 6 rectified 5-cells). It is also called 0_{3,1} for its branching Coxeter-Dynkin diagram, shown as.

E. L. Elte identified it in 1912 as a semiregular polytope, labeling it as S^{1}_{5}.

=== Alternate names ===
- Rectified hexateron (Acronym: rix) (Jonathan Bowers)

=== Coordinates ===
The vertices of the rectified 5-simplex can be more simply positioned on a hyperplane in 6-space as permutations of (0,0,0,0,1,1) or (0,0,1,1,1,1). These construction can be seen as facets of the rectified 6-orthoplex or birectified 6-cube respectively.

=== As a configuration ===
This configuration matrix represents the rectified 5-simplex. The rows and columns correspond to vertices, edges, faces, cells and 4-faces. The diagonal numbers say how many of each element occur in the whole rectified 5-simplex. The nondiagonal numbers say how many of the column's element occur in or at the row's element.

The diagonal f-vector numbers are derived through the Wythoff construction, dividing the full group order of a subgroup order by removing one mirror at a time.

A_{5}	k-face	f_{k}	f_{0}	f_{1}	f_{2}		f_{3}		f_{4}		k-figure	Notes
A_{3}A_{1}	( )	f_{0}	15	8	4	12	6	8	4	2	{3,3}×{ }	A_{5}/A_{3}A_{1} = 6!/4!/2 = 15
A_{2}A_{1}	{ }	f_{1}	2	60	1	3	3	3	3	1	{3}∨( )	A_{5}/A_{2}A_{1} = 6!/3!/2 = 60
A_{2}A_{2}	r{3}	f_{2}	3	3	20	*	3	0	3	0	{3}	A_{5}/A_{2}A_{2} = 6!/3!/3! =20
A_{2}A_{1}	{3}	f_{2}	3	3	*	60	1	2	2	1	{ }×( )	A_{5}/A_{2}A_{1} = 6!/3!/2 = 60
A_{3}A_{1}	r{3,3}	f_{3}	6	12	4	4	15	*	2	0	{ }	A_{5}/A_{3}A_{1} = 6!/4!/2 = 15
A_{3}	{3,3}	f_{3}	4	6	0	4	*	30	1	1	{ }	A_{5}/A_{3} = 6!/4! = 30
A_{4}	r{3,3,3}	f_{4}	10	30	10	20	5	5	6	*	( )	A_{5}/A_{4} = 6!/5! = 6
A_{4}	{3,3,3}	f_{4}	5	10	0	10	0	5	*	6	( )	A_{5}/A_{4} = 6!/5! = 6

=== Images ===
Stereographic projection
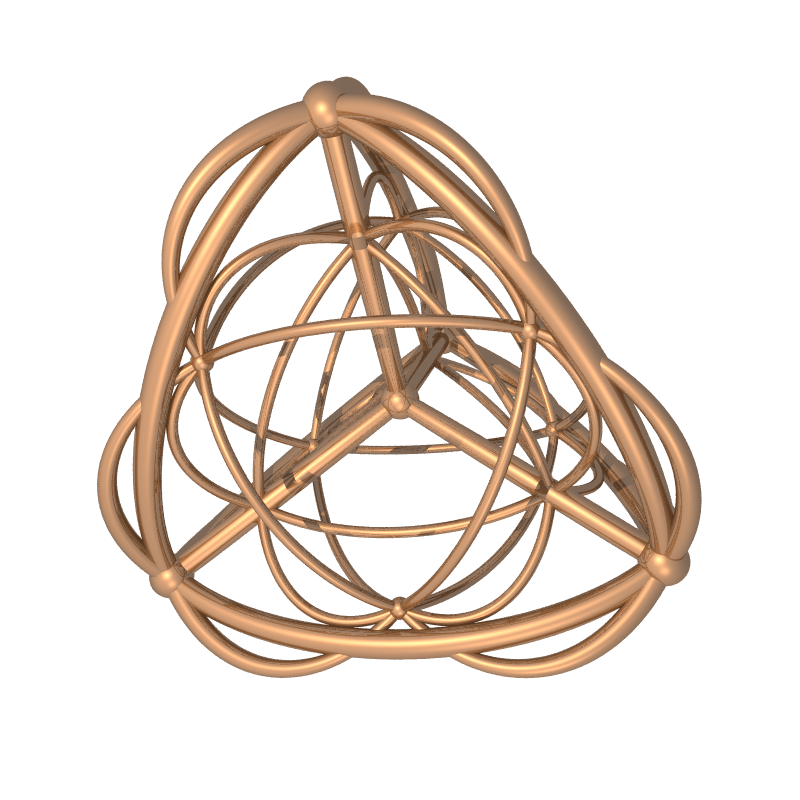
Stereographic projection of spherical form

Orthographic projections
A_{k} Coxeter plane	A_{5}	A_{4}
Graph		
Dihedral symmetry	[6]	[5]
A_{k} Coxeter plane	A_{3}	A_{2}
Graph		
Dihedral symmetry	[4]	[3]

=== Related polytopes ===
The rectified 5-simplex, 0_{31}, is second in a dimensional series of uniform polytopes, expressed by Coxeter as 1_{3k} series. The fifth figure is a Euclidean honeycomb, 3_{31}, and the final is a noncompact hyperbolic honeycomb, 4_{31}. Each progressive uniform polytope is constructed from the previous as its vertex figure.

k_{31} dimensional figures
n	4	5	6	7	8	9
Coxeter group	A_{3}A_{1}	A_{5}	D_{6}	E_{7}	${\tilde{E}}_{7}$ = E_{7}^{+}	${\bar{T}}_8$=E_{7}^{++}
Coxeter diagram						
Symmetry	[3^{−1,3,1}]	[3^{0,3,1}]	[3^{1,3,1}]	[3^{2,3,1}]	[3^{3,3,1}]	[3^{4,3,1}]
Order	48	720	23,040	2,903,040	∞	
Graph					-	-
Name	−1_{31}	0_{31}	1_{31}	2_{31}	3_{31}	4_{31}

== Birectified 5-simplex ==
Birectified 5-simplex Birectified hexateron (dot)
Type	uniform 5-polytope	
Schläfli symbol	2r{3^{4}} = {3^{2,2}} or $\left\{\begin{array}{l}3, 3\\3, 3\end{array}\right\}$	
Coxeter diagram	or	
4-faces	12	12 r{3,3,3}
Cells	60	30 {3,3} 30 r{3,3}
Faces	120	120 {3}
Edges	90	
Vertices	20	
Vertex figure	{3}×{3}	
Coxeter group	A_{5}×2, [[3^{4}]], order 1440	
Dual		
Base point	(0,0,0,1,1,1)	
Circumradius	0.866025	
Properties	convex, isogonal isotoxal	

The birectified 5-simplex is isotopic, with all 12 of its facets as rectified 5-cells. It has 20 vertices, 90 edges, 120 triangular faces, 60 cells (30 tetrahedral, and 30 octahedral).

E. L. Elte identified it in 1912 as a semiregular polytope, labeling it as S^{2}_{5}.

It is also called 0_{2,2} for its branching Coxeter-Dynkin diagram, shown as. It is seen in the vertex figure of the 6-dimensional 1_{22},.

=== Alternate names ===
- Birectified hexateron
- dodecateron (Acronym: dot) (For 12-facetted polyteron) (Jonathan Bowers)

=== Construction ===
The elements of the regular polytopes can be expressed in a configuration matrix. Rows and columns reference vertices, edges, faces, and cells, with diagonal element their counts (f-vectors). The nondiagonal elements represent the number of row elements are incident to the column element. The diagonal f-vector numbers are derived through the Wythoff construction, dividing the full group order of a subgroup order by removing one mirror at a time.

A_{5}	k-face	f_{k}	f_{0}	f_{1}	f_{2}		f_{3}			f_{4}		k-figure	Notes
A_{2}A_{2}	( )	f_{0}	20	9	9	9	3	9	3	3	3	{3}×{3}	A_{5}/A_{2}A_{2} = 6!/3!/3! = 20
A_{1}A_{1}A_{1}	{ }	f_{1}	2	90	2	2	1	4	1	2	2	{ }∨{ }	A_{5}/A_{1}A_{1}A_{1} = 6!/2/2/2 = 90
A_{2}A_{1}	{3}	f_{2}	3	3	60	*	1	2	0	2	1	{ }∨( )	A_{5}/A_{2}A_{1} = 6!/3!/2 = 60
A_{2}A_{1}	{3}	f_{2}	3	3	*	60	0	2	1	1	2	{ }∨( )	A_{5}/A_{2}A_{1} = 6!/3!/2 = 60
A_{3}A_{1}	{3,3}	f_{3}	4	6	4	0	15	*	*	2	0	{ }	A_{5}/A_{3}A_{1} = 6!/4!/2 = 15
A_{3}	r{3,3}	f_{3}	6	12	4	4	*	30	*	1	1	{ }	A_{5}/A_{3} = 6!/4! = 30
A_{3}A_{1}	{3,3}	f_{3}	4	6	0	4	*	*	15	0	2	{ }	A_{5}/A_{3}A_{1} = 6!/4!/2 = 15
A_{4}	r{3,3,3}	f_{4}	10	30	20	10	5	5	0	6	*	( )	A_{5}/A_{4} = 6!/5! = 6
A_{4}	r{3,3,3}	f_{4}	10	30	10	20	0	5	5	*	6	( )	A_{5}/A_{4} = 6!/5! = 6

=== Images ===
The A5 projection has an identical appearance to Metatron's Cube.

Orthographic projections
A_{k} Coxeter plane	A_{5}	A_{4}
Graph		
Dihedral symmetry	[6]	[[5]]=[10]
A_{k} Coxeter plane	A_{3}	A_{2}
Graph		
Dihedral symmetry	[4]	[[3]]=[6]

=== Intersection of two 5-simplices ===
Stereographic projection
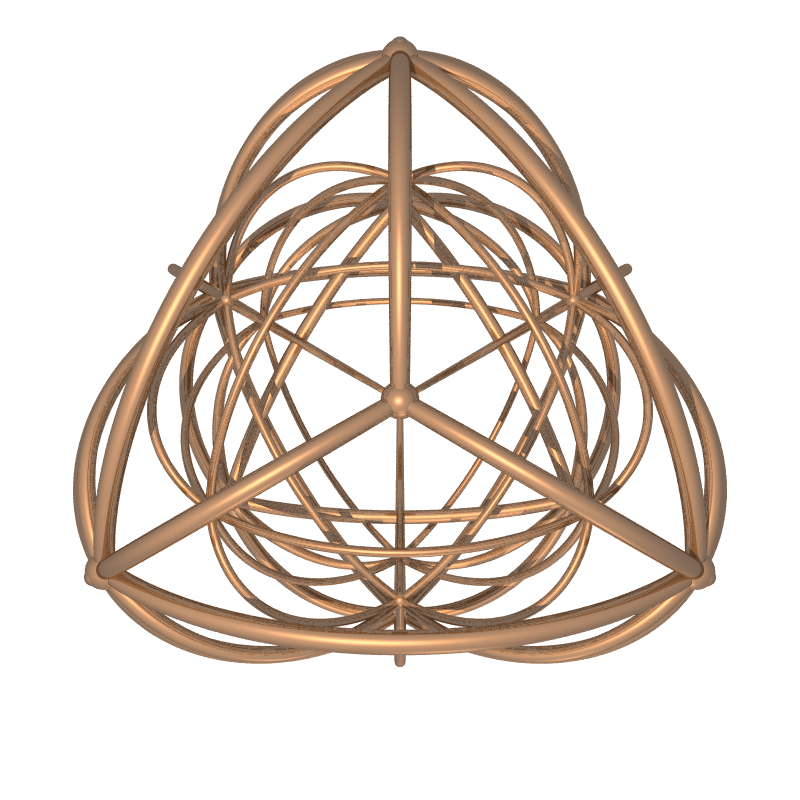

The birectified 5-simplex is the intersection of two regular 5-simplexes in dual configuration. The vertices of a birectification exist at the center of the faces of the original polytope(s). This intersection is analogous to the 3D stellated octahedron, seen as a compound of two regular tetrahedra and intersected in a central octahedron, while that is a first rectification where vertices are at the center of the original edges.

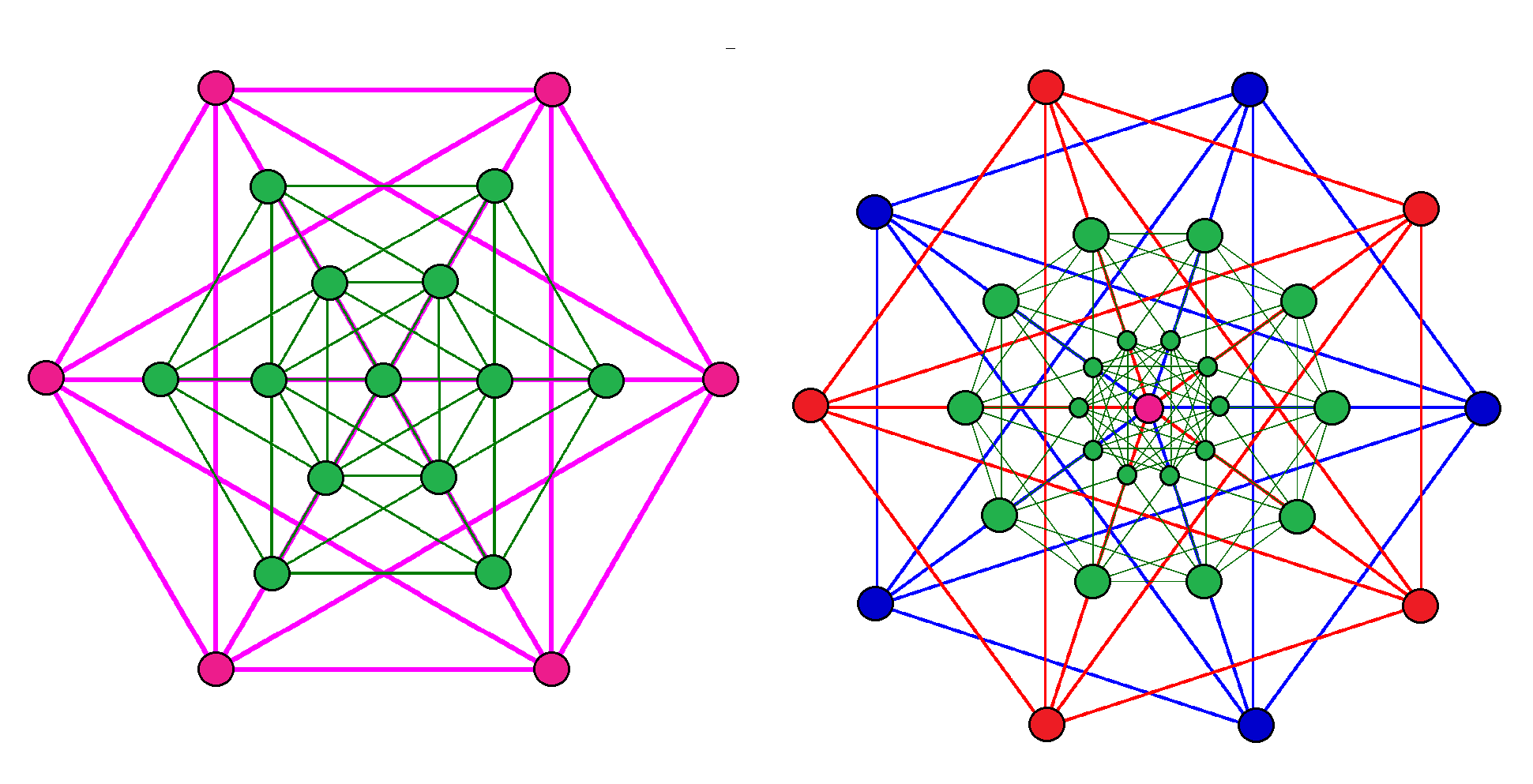
Dual 5-simplexes (red and blue), and their birectified 5-simplex intersection in green, viewed in A5 and A4 Coxeter planes. The simplexes overlap in the A5 projection and are drawn in magenta.

It is also the intersection of a 6-cube with the hyperplane that bisects the 6-cube's long diagonal orthogonally. In this sense it is the 5-dimensional analog of the regular hexagon, octahedron, and bitruncated 5-cell. This characterization yields simple coordinates for the vertices of a birectified 5-simplex in 6-space: the 20 distinct permutations of (1,1,1,−1,−1,−1).

The vertices of the birectified 5-simplex can also be positioned on a hyperplane in 6-space as permutations of (0,0,0,1,1,1). This construction can be seen as facets of the birectified 6-orthoplex.

=== Related polytopes ===
==== k_{22} polytopes ====
The birectified 5-simplex, 0_{22}, is second in a dimensional series of uniform polytopes, expressed by Coxeter as k_{22} series. The birectified 5-simplex is the vertex figure for the third, the 1_{22}. The fourth figure is a Euclidean honeycomb, 2_{22}, and the final is a noncompact hyperbolic honeycomb, 3_{22}. Each progressive uniform polytope is constructed from the previous as its vertex figure.

k_{22} figures in n dimensions
Space	Finite			Euclidean	Hyperbolic
n	4	5	6	7	8
Coxeter group	A_{2}A_{2}	E_{6}	${\tilde{E}}_{6}$=E_{6}^{+}	${\bar{T}}_7$=E_{6}^{++}	
Coxeter diagram					
Symmetry	[[3^{2,2,-1}]]	[[3^{2,2,0}]]	[[3^{2,2,1}]]	[[3^{2,2,2}]]	[[3^{2,2,3}]]
Order	72	1440	103,680	∞	
Graph				∞	∞
Name	−1_{22}	0_{22}	1_{22}	2_{22}	3_{22}

==== Isotopic polytopes ====
Isotopic uniform truncated simplices
Dim.	2	3	4	5	6	7	8
Name Coxeter	Hexagon = t{3} = {6}	Octahedron = r{3,3} = {3^{1,1}} = {3,4} $\left\{\begin{array}{l}3\\3\end{array}\right\}$	Decachoron 2t{3^{3}}	Dodecateron 2r{3^{4}} = {3^{2,2}} $\left\{\begin{array}{l}3, 3\\3 ,3\end{array}\right\}$	Tetradecapeton 3t{3^{5}}	Hexadecaexon 3r{3^{6}} = {3^{3,3}} $\left\{\begin{array}{l}3, 3, 3\\3, 3, 3\end{array}\right\}$	Octadecazetton 4t{3^{7}}
Images							
Vertex figure	( )∨( )	{ }×{ }	{ }∨{ }	{3}×{3}	{3}∨{3}	{3,3}×{3,3}	{3,3}∨{3,3}
Facets		{3}	t{3,3}	r{3,3,3}	2t{3,3,3,3}	2r{3,3,3,3,3}	3t{3,3,3,3,3,3}
As intersecting dual simplexes	∩	∩	∩	∩	∩	∩	∩

== Related uniform 5-polytopes ==
This polytope is the vertex figure of the 6-demicube, and the edge figure of the uniform 2_{31} polytope.

It is also one of 19 uniform polytera based on the [3,3,3,3] Coxeter group, all shown here in A_{5} Coxeter plane orthographic projections. (Vertices are colored by projection overlap order, red, orange, yellow, green, cyan, blue, purple having progressively more vertices)

A5 polytopes
t_{0}	t_{1}	t_{2}	t_{0,1}	t_{0,2}	t_{1,2}	t_{0,3}
t_{1,3}	t_{0,4}	t_{0,1,2}	t_{0,1,3}	t_{0,2,3}	t_{1,2,3}	t_{0,1,4}
t_{0,2,4}	t_{0,1,2,3}	t_{0,1,2,4}	t_{0,1,3,4}	t_{0,1,2,3,4}		

Fundamental convex regular and uniform polytopes in dimensions 2–10
Family	A_{n}	B_{n}	I_{2}(p) / D_{n}	E_{6} / E_{7} / E_{8} / F_{4} / G_{2}	H_{n}
Regular polygon	Triangle	Square	p-gon	Hexagon	Pentagon
Uniform polyhedron	Tetrahedron	Octahedron • Cube	Demicube		Dodecahedron • Icosahedron
Uniform polychoron	Pentachoron	16-cell • Tesseract	Demitesseract	24-cell	120-cell • 600-cell
Uniform 5-polytope	5-simplex	5-orthoplex • 5-cube	5-demicube		
Uniform 6-polytope	6-simplex	6-orthoplex • 6-cube	6-demicube	1_{22} • 2_{21}	
Uniform 7-polytope	7-simplex	7-orthoplex • 7-cube	7-demicube	1_{32} • 2_{31} • 3_{21}	
Uniform 8-polytope	8-simplex	8-orthoplex • 8-cube	8-demicube	1_{42} • 2_{41} • 4_{21}	
Uniform 9-polytope	9-simplex	9-orthoplex • 9-cube	9-demicube		
Uniform 10-polytope	10-simplex	10-orthoplex • 10-cube	10-demicube		
Uniform n-polytope	n-simplex	n-orthoplex • n-cube	n-demicube	1_{k2} • 2_{k1} • k_{21}	n-pentagonal polytope
Topics: Polytope families • Regular polytope • List of regular polytopes and compounds • Polytope operations
