= Truncated 5-simplexes =

5-simplex	Truncated 5-simplex	Bitruncated 5-simplex
Orthogonal projections in A_{5} Coxeter plane

In five-dimensional geometry, a truncated 5-simplex is a convex uniform 5-polytope, being a truncation of the regular 5-simplex.

There are unique 2 degrees of truncation. Vertices of the truncation 5-simplex are located as pairs on the edge of the 5-simplex. Vertices of the bitruncation 5-simplex are located on the triangular faces of the 5-simplex.

== Truncated 5-simplex ==
Truncated 5-simplex
Type	Uniform 5-polytope	
Schläfli symbol	t{3,3,3,3}	
Coxeter-Dynkin diagram		
4-faces	12	6 {3,3,3} 6 t{3,3,3}
Cells	45	30 {3,3} 15 t{3,3}
Faces	80	60 {3} 20 {6}
Edges	75	
Vertices	30	
Vertex figure	( )v{3,3}	
Coxeter group	A_{5} [3,3,3,3], order 720	
Properties	convex	

The truncated 5-simplex has 30 vertices, 75 edges, 80 triangular faces, 45 cells (15 tetrahedral, and 30 truncated tetrahedron), and 12 4-faces (6 5-cell and 6 truncated 5-cells).

=== Alternate names ===
- Truncated hexateron (Acronym: tix) (Jonathan Bowers)

=== Coordinates ===
The vertices of the truncated 5-simplex can be most simply constructed on a hyperplane in 6-space as permutations of (0,0,0,0,1,2) or of (0,1,2,2,2,2). These coordinates come from facets of the truncated 6-orthoplex and bitruncated 6-cube respectively.

=== Images ===
Orthographic projections
A_{k} Coxeter plane	A_{5}	A_{4}
Graph		
Dihedral symmetry	[6]	[5]
A_{k} Coxeter plane	A_{3}	A_{2}
Graph		
Dihedral symmetry	[4]	[3]

== Bitruncated 5-simplex ==
Bitruncated 5-simplex
Type	Uniform 5-polytope	
Schläfli symbol	2t{3,3,3,3}	
Coxeter-Dynkin diagram		
4-faces	12	6 2t{3,3,3} 6 t{3,3,3}
Cells	60	45 {3,3} 15 t{3,3}
Faces	140	80 {3} 60 {6}
Edges	150	
Vertices	60	
Vertex figure	{ }v{3}	
Coxeter group	A_{5} [3,3,3,3], order 720	
Properties	convex	

=== Alternate names ===
- Bitruncated hexateron (Acronym: bittix) (Jonathan Bowers)

=== Coordinates ===
The vertices of the bitruncated 5-simplex can be most simply constructed on a hyperplane in 6-space as permutations of (0,0,0,1,2,2) or of (0,0,1,2,2,2). These represent positive orthant facets of the bitruncated 6-orthoplex, and the tritruncated 6-cube respectively.

=== Images ===
Orthographic projections
A_{k} Coxeter plane	A_{5}	A_{4}
Graph		
Dihedral symmetry	[6]	[5]
A_{k} Coxeter plane	A_{3}	A_{2}
Graph		
Dihedral symmetry	[4]	[3]

== Related uniform 5-polytopes ==
The truncated 5-simplex is one of 19 uniform 5-polytopes based on the [3,3,3,3] Coxeter group, all shown here in A_{5} Coxeter plane orthographic projections. (Vertices are colored by projection overlap order, red, orange, yellow, green, cyan, blue, purple, magenta having progressively more vertices.)

A5 polytopes
t_{0}	t_{1}	t_{2}	t_{0,1}	t_{0,2}	t_{1,2}	t_{0,3}
t_{1,3}	t_{0,4}	t_{0,1,2}	t_{0,1,3}	t_{0,2,3}	t_{1,2,3}	t_{0,1,4}
t_{0,2,4}	t_{0,1,2,3}	t_{0,1,2,4}	t_{0,1,3,4}	t_{0,1,2,3,4}		

== Notes ==
Fundamental convex regular and uniform polytopes in dimensions 2–10
Family	A_{n}	B_{n}	I_{2}(p) / D_{n}	E_{6} / E_{7} / E_{8} / F_{4} / G_{2}	H_{n}
Regular polygon	Triangle	Square	p-gon	Hexagon	Pentagon
Uniform polyhedron	Tetrahedron	Octahedron • Cube	Demicube		Dodecahedron • Icosahedron
Uniform polychoron	Pentachoron	16-cell • Tesseract	Demitesseract	24-cell	120-cell • 600-cell
Uniform 5-polytope	5-simplex	5-orthoplex • 5-cube	5-demicube		
Uniform 6-polytope	6-simplex	6-orthoplex • 6-cube	6-demicube	1_{22} • 2_{21}	
Uniform 7-polytope	7-simplex	7-orthoplex • 7-cube	7-demicube	1_{32} • 2_{31} • 3_{21}	
Uniform 8-polytope	8-simplex	8-orthoplex • 8-cube	8-demicube	1_{42} • 2_{41} • 4_{21}	
Uniform 9-polytope	9-simplex	9-orthoplex • 9-cube	9-demicube		
Uniform 10-polytope	10-simplex	10-orthoplex • 10-cube	10-demicube		
Uniform n-polytope	n-simplex	n-orthoplex • n-cube	n-demicube	1_{k2} • 2_{k1} • k_{21}	n-pentagonal polytope
Topics: Polytope families • Regular polytope • List of regular polytopes and compounds • Polytope operations
