= Omnitruncated 5-simplex honeycomb =

Five dimensional space-filling tessellation

Omnitruncated 5-simplex honeycomb
(No image)
Type	Uniform honeycomb
Family	Omnitruncated simplectic honeycomb
Schläfli symbol	t_{012345}{3^{[6]}}
Coxeter–Dynkin diagram	
5-face types	t_{01234}{3,3,3,3}
4-face types	t_{0123}{3,3,3} {}×t_{012}{3,3} {6}×{6}
Cell types	t_{012}{3,3} {4,3} {}x{6}
Face types	{4} {6}
Vertex figure	Irr. 5-simplex
Symmetry	${\tilde{A}}_5$×12, [6[3^{[6]}]]
Properties	vertex-transitive

In five-dimensional Euclidean geometry, the omnitruncated 5-simplex honeycomb or omnitruncated hexateric honeycomb is a space-filling tessellation (or honeycomb). It is composed entirely of omnitruncated 5-simplex facets.

The facets of all omnitruncated simplectic honeycombs are called permutahedra and can be positioned in n+1 space with integral coordinates, permutations of the whole numbers (0,1,..,n).

== A_{5}^{*} lattice ==
The A^{*}_{5} lattice (also called A^{6}_{5}) is the union of six A_{5} lattices, and is the dual vertex arrangement to the omnitruncated 5-simplex honeycomb, and therefore the Voronoi cell of this lattice is an omnitruncated 5-simplex.

∪ ∪ ∪ ∪ ∪ = dual of

== Related polytopes and honeycombs ==
This honeycomb is one of 12 unique uniform honeycombs constructed by the ${\tilde{A}}_5$ Coxeter group. The extended symmetry of the hexagonal diagram of the ${\tilde{A}}_5$ Coxeter group allows for automorphisms that map diagram nodes (mirrors) on to each other. So the various 12 honeycombs represent higher symmetries based on the ring arrangement symmetry in the diagrams:

A5 honeycombs
Hexagon symmetry	Extended symmetry	Extended diagram	Extended group	Honeycomb diagrams
a1	[3^{[6]}]		${\tilde{A}}_5$	
d2	<[3^{[6]}]>		${\tilde{A}}_5$×2_{1}	_{1},,,,
p2	[[3^{[6]}]]		${\tilde{A}}_5$×2_{2}	_{2},
i4	[<[3^{[6]}]>]		${\tilde{A}}_5$×2_{1}×2_{2}	,
d6	<3[3^{[6]}]>		${\tilde{A}}_5$×6_{1}	
r12	[6[3^{[6]}]]		${\tilde{A}}_5$×12	_{3}

=== Projection by folding ===
The omnitruncated 5-simplex honeycomb can be projected into the 3-dimensional omnitruncated cubic honeycomb by a geometric folding operation that maps two pairs of mirrors into each other, sharing the same 3-space vertex arrangement:

${\tilde{A}}_5$
${\tilde{C}}_3$

== See also ==
Regular and uniform honeycombs in 5-space:

- 5-cube honeycomb
- 5-demicube honeycomb
- 5-simplex honeycomb

== Notes ==
Fundamental convex regular and uniform honeycombs in dimensions 2–9
Space	Family	${\tilde{A}}_{n-1}$	${\tilde{C}}_{n-1}$	${\tilde{B}}_{n-1}$	${\tilde{D}}_{n-1}$	${\tilde{G}}_2$ / ${\tilde{F}}_4$ / ${\tilde{E}}_{n-1}$
E^{2}	Uniform tiling	0_{[3]}	δ_{3}	hδ_{3}	qδ_{3}	Hexagonal
E^{3}	Uniform convex honeycomb	0_{[4]}	δ_{4}	hδ_{4}	qδ_{4}	
E^{4}	Uniform 4-honeycomb	0_{[5]}	δ_{5}	hδ_{5}	qδ_{5}	24-cell honeycomb
E^{5}	Uniform 5-honeycomb	0_{[6]}	δ_{6}	hδ_{6}	qδ_{6}	
E^{6}	Uniform 6-honeycomb	0_{[7]}	δ_{7}	hδ_{7}	qδ_{7}	2_{22}
E^{7}	Uniform 7-honeycomb	0_{[8]}	δ_{8}	hδ_{8}	qδ_{8}	1_{33} • 3_{31}
E^{8}	Uniform 8-honeycomb	0_{[9]}	δ_{9}	hδ_{9}	qδ_{9}	1_{52} • 2_{51} • 5_{21}
E^{9}	Uniform 9-honeycomb	0_{[10]}	δ_{10}	hδ_{10}	qδ_{10}	
E^{10}	Uniform 10-honeycomb	0_{[11]}	δ_{11}	hδ_{11}	qδ_{11}	
E^{n−1}	Uniform (n−1)-honeycomb	0_{[n]}	δ_{n}	hδ_{n}	qδ_{n}	1_{k2} • 2_{k1} • k_{21}
