= Orthant =

Generalization of a quadrant to any dimension

In two dimensions, there are four orthants (called quadrants)

In geometry, an orthant or hyperoctant is the analogue in n-dimensional Euclidean space of a quadrant in the plane or an octant in three dimensions.

In general an orthant in n-dimensions can be considered the intersection of n mutually orthogonal half-spaces. By independent selections of half-space signs, there are 2^{n} orthants in n-dimensional space.

More specifically, a closed orthant in R^{n} is a subset defined by constraining each Cartesian coordinate to be nonnegative or nonpositive. Such a subset is defined by a system of inequalities:

ε_{1}x_{1} ≥ 0 ε_{2}x_{2} ≥ 0 · · · ε_{n}x_{n} ≥ 0,

where each ε_{i} is +1 or −1.

Similarly, an open orthant in R^{n} is a subset defined by a system of strict inequalities

ε_{1}x_{1} > 0 ε_{2}x_{2} > 0 · · · ε_{n}x_{n} > 0,

where each ε_{i} is +1 or −1.

By dimension:

- In one dimension, an orthant is a ray.
- In two dimensions, an orthant is a quadrant.
- In three dimensions, an orthant is an octant.

John Conway and Neil Sloane defined the term n-orthoplex from orthant complex as a regular polytope in n-dimensions with 2^{n} simplex facets, one per orthant.

The nonnegative orthant is the generalization of the first quadrant to n-dimensions and is important in many constrained optimization problems.

== See also ==
- Cross polytope (or orthoplex) – a family of regular polytopes in n-dimensions which can be constructed with one simplex facets in each orthant space.
- Measure polytope (or hypercube) – a family of regular polytopes in n-dimensions which can be constructed with one vertex in each orthant space.
- Orthotope – generalization of a rectangle in n-dimensions, with one vertex in each orthant.
