= Truncated 16-cell honeycomb =

Truncated 16-cell honeycomb
(No image)
Type	Uniform honeycomb
Schläfli symbols	t{3,3,4,3} h_{2}{4,3,3,4} t{3,3^{1,1,1}}
Coxeter diagrams	=
4-face type	{3,4,3} t{3,3,4}
Cell type	{3,3} t{3,3}
Face type	{3} {6}
Vertex figure	cubic pyramid
Coxeter group	${\tilde{F}}_4$ = [3,3,4,3] ${\tilde{B}}_4$ = [4,3,3^{1,1}] ${\tilde{D}}_4$ = [3^{1,1,1,1}]
Dual	?
Properties	vertex-transitive

In four-dimensional Euclidean geometry, the truncated 16-cell honeycomb (or cantic tesseractic honeycomb) is a uniform space-filling tessellation (or honeycomb) in Euclidean 4-space. It is constructed by 24-cell and truncated 16-cell facets.

== Alternate names ==
- Truncated hexadecachoric tetracomb / Truncated hexadecachoric honeycomb

== Related honeycombs ==
The [3,4,3,3],, Coxeter group generates 31 permutations of uniform tessellations, 28 are unique in this family and ten are shared in the [4,3,3,4] and [4,3,3^{1,1}] families. The alternation (13) is also repeated in other families.

F4 honeycombs
Extended symmetry	Extended diagram	Order	Honeycombs
[3,3,4,3]		×1	_{1}, _{3}, _{5}, _{6}, _{8}, _{9}, _{10}, _{11}, _{12}
[3,4,3,3]		×1	_{2}, _{4}, _{7}, _{13}, _{14}, _{15}, _{16}, _{17}, _{18}, _{19}, _{20}, _{21}, _{22} _{23}, _{24}, _{25}, _{26}, _{27}, _{28}, _{29}
[(3,3)[3,3,4,3^{*}]] =[(3,3)[3^{1,1,1,1}]] =[3,4,3,3]	= =	×4	_{(2)}, _{(4)}, _{(7)}, _{(13)}

The [4,3,3,4],, Coxeter group generates 31 permutations of uniform tessellations, 21 with distinct symmetry and 20 with distinct geometry. The expanded tesseractic honeycomb (also known as the stericated tesseractic honeycomb) is geometrically identical to the tesseractic honeycomb. Three of the symmetric honeycombs are shared in the [3,4,3,3] family. Two alternations (13) and (17), and the quarter tesseractic (2) are repeated in other families.

C4 honeycombs
Extended symmetry	Extended diagram	Order	Honeycombs
[4,3,3,4]:		×1	_{1}, _{2}, _{3}, _{4}, _{5}, _{6}, _{7}, _{8}, _{9}, _{10}, _{11}, _{12}, _{13}
[[4,3,3,4]]		×2	_{(1)}, _{(2)}, _{(13)}, _{18} _{(6)}, _{19}, _{20}
[(3,3)[1^{+},4,3,3,4,1^{+}]] ↔ [(3,3)[3^{1,1,1,1}]] ↔ [3,4,3,3]	↔ ↔	×6	_{14}, _{15}, _{16}, _{17}

The [4,3,3^{1,1}],, Coxeter group generates 31 permutations of uniform tessellations, 23 with distinct symmetry and 4 with distinct geometry. There are two alternated forms: the alternations (19) and (24) have the same geometry as the 16-cell honeycomb and snub 24-cell honeycomb respectively.

B4 honeycombs
Extended symmetry	Extended diagram	Order	Honeycombs
[4,3,3^{1,1}]:		×1	_{5}, _{6}, _{7}, _{8}
<[4,3,3^{1,1}]>: ↔[4,3,3,4]	↔	×2	_{9}, _{10}, _{11}, _{12}, _{13}, _{14}, _{(10)}, _{15}, _{16}, _{(13)}, _{17}, _{18}, _{19}
[3[1^{+},4,3,3^{1,1}]] ↔ [3[3,3^{1,1,1}]] ↔ [3,3,4,3]	↔ ↔	×3	_{1}, _{2}, _{3}, _{4}
[(3,3)[1^{+},4,3,3^{1,1}]] ↔ [(3,3)[3^{1,1,1,1}]] ↔ [3,4,3,3]	↔ ↔	×12	_{20}, _{21}, _{22}, _{23}

There are ten uniform honeycombs constructed by the ${\tilde{D}}_4$ Coxeter group, all repeated in other families by extended symmetry, seen in the graph symmetry of rings in the Coxeter–Dynkin diagrams. The 10th is constructed as an alternation. As subgroups in Coxeter notation: [3,4,(3,3)^{*}] (index 24), [3,3,4,3^{*}] (index 6), [1^{+},4,3,3,4,1^{+}] (index 4), [3^{1,1},3,4,1^{+}] (index 2) are all isomorphic to [3^{1,1,1,1}].

The ten permutations are listed with its highest extended symmetry relation:

D4 honeycombs
Extended symmetry	Extended diagram	Extended group	Honeycombs
[3^{1,1,1,1}]		${\tilde{D}}_4$	(none)
<[3^{1,1,1,1}]> ↔ [3^{1,1},3,4]	↔	${\tilde{D}}_4$×2 = ${\tilde{B}}_4$	(none)
<2[^{1,1}3^{1,1}]> ↔ [4,3,3,4]	↔	${\tilde{D}}_4$×4 = ${\tilde{C}}_4$	_{1}, _{2}
[3[3,3^{1,1,1}]] ↔ [3,3,4,3]	↔	${\tilde{D}}_4$×6 = ${\tilde{F}}_4$	_{3}, _{4}, _{5}, _{6}
[4[^{1,1}3^{1,1}]] ↔ [[4,3,3,4]]	↔	${\tilde{D}}_4$×8 = ${\tilde{C}}_4$×2	_{7}, _{8}, _{9}
[(3,3)[3^{1,1,1,1}]] ↔ [3,4,3,3]	↔	${\tilde{D}}_4$×24 = ${\tilde{F}}_4$	_{7}, _{8}, _{9}
[(3,3)[3^{1,1,1,1}]]^{+} ↔ [3^{+},4,3,3]	↔	½${\tilde{D}}_4$×24 = ½${\tilde{F}}_4$	_{10}

== See also ==
Regular and uniform honeycombs in 4-space:

- Tesseractic honeycomb
- 16-cell honeycomb
- 24-cell honeycomb
- Rectified 24-cell honeycomb
- Truncated 24-cell honeycomb
- Snub 24-cell honeycomb
- 5-cell honeycomb
- Truncated 5-cell honeycomb
- Omnitruncated 5-cell honeycomb

== Notes ==
Fundamental convex regular and uniform honeycombs in dimensions 2–9
Space	Family	${\tilde{A}}_{n-1}$	${\tilde{C}}_{n-1}$	${\tilde{B}}_{n-1}$	${\tilde{D}}_{n-1}$	${\tilde{G}}_2$ / ${\tilde{F}}_4$ / ${\tilde{E}}_{n-1}$
E^{2}	Uniform tiling	0_{[3]}	δ_{3}	hδ_{3}	qδ_{3}	Hexagonal
E^{3}	Uniform convex honeycomb	0_{[4]}	δ_{4}	hδ_{4}	qδ_{4}	
E^{4}	Uniform 4-honeycomb	0_{[5]}	δ_{5}	hδ_{5}	qδ_{5}	24-cell honeycomb
E^{5}	Uniform 5-honeycomb	0_{[6]}	δ_{6}	hδ_{6}	qδ_{6}	
E^{6}	Uniform 6-honeycomb	0_{[7]}	δ_{7}	hδ_{7}	qδ_{7}	2_{22}
E^{7}	Uniform 7-honeycomb	0_{[8]}	δ_{8}	hδ_{8}	qδ_{8}	1_{33} • 3_{31}
E^{8}	Uniform 8-honeycomb	0_{[9]}	δ_{9}	hδ_{9}	qδ_{9}	1_{52} • 2_{51} • 5_{21}
E^{9}	Uniform 9-honeycomb	0_{[10]}	δ_{10}	hδ_{10}	qδ_{10}	
E^{10}	Uniform 10-honeycomb	0_{[11]}	δ_{11}	hδ_{11}	qδ_{11}	
E^{n−1}	Uniform (n−1)-honeycomb	0_{[n]}	δ_{n}	hδ_{n}	qδ_{n}	1_{k2} • 2_{k1} • k_{21}
