= Stericantic tesseractic honeycomb =

Stericantic tesseractic honeycomb
(No image)
Type	Uniform honeycomb
Schläfli symbol	h_{2,4}{4,3,3,4}
Coxeter-Dynkin diagram	=
4-face type	rr{4,3,3} t_{0,1,3}{3,3,4} t{3,3,4} {3,3}×{}
Cell type	rr{4,3} {3,4} {4,3} t{3,3} t{3}×{} {3}×{}
Face type	{6} {4} {3}
Vertex figure	
Coxeter group	${\tilde{B}}_4$ = [4,3,3^{1,1}]
Dual	?
Properties	vertex-transitive

In four-dimensional Euclidean geometry, the stericantic tesseractic honeycomb is a uniform space-filling tessellation (or honeycomb) in Euclidean 4-space.

== Alternate names ==
- Prismatotruncated demitesseractic tetracomb (pithatit)
- Small prismatodemitesseractic tetracomb

== Related honeycombs ==
The [4,3,3^{1,1}],, Coxeter group generates 31 permutations of uniform tessellations, 23 with distinct symmetry and 4 with distinct geometry. There are two alternated forms: the alternations (19) and (24) have the same geometry as the 16-cell honeycomb and snub 24-cell honeycomb respectively.

B4 honeycombs
Extended symmetry	Extended diagram	Order	Honeycombs
[4,3,3^{1,1}]:		×1	_{5}, _{6}, _{7}, _{8}
<[4,3,3^{1,1}]>: ↔[4,3,3,4]	↔	×2	_{9}, _{10}, _{11}, _{12}, _{13}, _{14}, _{(10)}, _{15}, _{16}, _{(13)}, _{17}, _{18}, _{19}
[3[1^{+},4,3,3^{1,1}]] ↔ [3[3,3^{1,1,1}]] ↔ [3,3,4,3]	↔ ↔	×3	_{1}, _{2}, _{3}, _{4}
[(3,3)[1^{+},4,3,3^{1,1}]] ↔ [(3,3)[3^{1,1,1,1}]] ↔ [3,4,3,3]	↔ ↔	×12	_{20}, _{21}, _{22}, _{23}

== See also ==
Regular and uniform honeycombs in 4-space:

- Tesseractic honeycomb
- 16-cell honeycomb
- 24-cell honeycomb
- Rectified 24-cell honeycomb
- Truncated 24-cell honeycomb
- Snub 24-cell honeycomb
- 5-cell honeycomb
- Truncated 5-cell honeycomb
- Omnitruncated 5-cell honeycomb

== Notes ==
Fundamental convex regular and uniform honeycombs in dimensions 2–9
Space	Family	${\tilde{A}}_{n-1}$	${\tilde{C}}_{n-1}$	${\tilde{B}}_{n-1}$	${\tilde{D}}_{n-1}$	${\tilde{G}}_2$ / ${\tilde{F}}_4$ / ${\tilde{E}}_{n-1}$
E^{2}	Uniform tiling	0_{[3]}	δ_{3}	hδ_{3}	qδ_{3}	Hexagonal
E^{3}	Uniform convex honeycomb	0_{[4]}	δ_{4}	hδ_{4}	qδ_{4}	
E^{4}	Uniform 4-honeycomb	0_{[5]}	δ_{5}	hδ_{5}	qδ_{5}	24-cell honeycomb
E^{5}	Uniform 5-honeycomb	0_{[6]}	δ_{6}	hδ_{6}	qδ_{6}	
E^{6}	Uniform 6-honeycomb	0_{[7]}	δ_{7}	hδ_{7}	qδ_{7}	2_{22}
E^{7}	Uniform 7-honeycomb	0_{[8]}	δ_{8}	hδ_{8}	qδ_{8}	1_{33} • 3_{31}
E^{8}	Uniform 8-honeycomb	0_{[9]}	δ_{9}	hδ_{9}	qδ_{9}	1_{52} • 2_{51} • 5_{21}
E^{9}	Uniform 9-honeycomb	0_{[10]}	δ_{10}	hδ_{10}	qδ_{10}	
E^{10}	Uniform 10-honeycomb	0_{[11]}	δ_{11}	hδ_{11}	qδ_{11}	
E^{n−1}	Uniform (n−1)-honeycomb	0_{[n]}	δ_{n}	hδ_{n}	qδ_{n}	1_{k2} • 2_{k1} • k_{21}
