= Cantellated tesseractic honeycomb =

Cantellated tesseractic honeycomb
(No image)
Type	Uniform 4-honeycomb
Schläfli symbol	t_{0,2}{4,3,3,4} or rr{4,3,3,4} rr{4,3,3^{1,1}}
Coxeter-Dynkin diagram	
4-face type	t_{0,2}{4,3,3} t_{1}{3,3,4} {3,4}×{}
Cell type	Octahedron; Rhombicuboctahedron; Triangular prism
Face type	{3}, {4}
Vertex figure	Cubic wedge
Coxeter group	${\tilde{C}}_4$ = [4,3,3,4] ${\tilde{B}}_4$ = [4,3,3^{1,1}]
Dual	
Properties	vertex-transitive

In four-dimensional Euclidean geometry, the cantellated tesseractic honeycomb is a uniform space-filling tessellation (or honeycomb) in Euclidean 4-space. It is constructed by a cantellation of a tesseractic honeycomb creating cantellated tesseracts, and new 24-cell and octahedral prism facets at the original vertices.

== Related honeycombs ==
The [4,3,3,4],, Coxeter group generates 31 permutations of uniform tessellations, 21 with distinct symmetry and 20 with distinct geometry. The expanded tesseractic honeycomb (also known as the stericated tesseractic honeycomb) is geometrically identical to the tesseractic honeycomb. Three of the symmetric honeycombs are shared in the [3,4,3,3] family. Two alternations (13) and (17), and the quarter tesseractic (2) are repeated in other families.

C4 honeycombs
Extended symmetry	Extended diagram	Order	Honeycombs
[4,3,3,4]:		×1	_{1}, _{2}, _{3}, _{4}, _{5}, _{6}, _{7}, _{8}, _{9}, _{10}, _{11}, _{12}, _{13}
[[4,3,3,4]]		×2	_{(1)}, _{(2)}, _{(13)}, _{18} _{(6)}, _{19}, _{20}
[(3,3)[1^{+},4,3,3,4,1^{+}]] ↔ [(3,3)[3^{1,1,1,1}]] ↔ [3,4,3,3]	↔ ↔	×6	_{14}, _{15}, _{16}, _{17}

The [4,3,3^{1,1}],, Coxeter group generates 31 permutations of uniform tessellations, 23 with distinct symmetry and 4 with distinct geometry. There are two alternated forms: the alternations (19) and (24) have the same geometry as the 16-cell honeycomb and snub 24-cell honeycomb respectively.

B4 honeycombs
Extended symmetry	Extended diagram	Order	Honeycombs
[4,3,3^{1,1}]:		×1	_{5}, _{6}, _{7}, _{8}
<[4,3,3^{1,1}]>: ↔[4,3,3,4]	↔	×2	_{9}, _{10}, _{11}, _{12}, _{13}, _{14}, _{(10)}, _{15}, _{16}, _{(13)}, _{17}, _{18}, _{19}
[3[1^{+},4,3,3^{1,1}]] ↔ [3[3,3^{1,1,1}]] ↔ [3,3,4,3]	↔ ↔	×3	_{1}, _{2}, _{3}, _{4}
[(3,3)[1^{+},4,3,3^{1,1}]] ↔ [(3,3)[3^{1,1,1,1}]] ↔ [3,4,3,3]	↔ ↔	×12	_{20}, _{21}, _{22}, _{23}

== See also ==
Regular and uniform honeycombs in 4-space:

- Tesseractic honeycomb
- Demitesseractic honeycomb
- 24-cell honeycomb
- Truncated 24-cell honeycomb
- Snub 24-cell honeycomb
- 5-cell honeycomb
- Truncated 5-cell honeycomb
- Omnitruncated 5-cell honeycomb

== Notes ==
Fundamental convex regular and uniform honeycombs in dimensions 2–9
Space	Family	${\tilde{A}}_{n-1}$	${\tilde{C}}_{n-1}$	${\tilde{B}}_{n-1}$	${\tilde{D}}_{n-1}$	${\tilde{G}}_2$ / ${\tilde{F}}_4$ / ${\tilde{E}}_{n-1}$
E^{2}	Uniform tiling	0_{[3]}	δ_{3}	hδ_{3}	qδ_{3}	Hexagonal
E^{3}	Uniform convex honeycomb	0_{[4]}	δ_{4}	hδ_{4}	qδ_{4}	
E^{4}	Uniform 4-honeycomb	0_{[5]}	δ_{5}	hδ_{5}	qδ_{5}	24-cell honeycomb
E^{5}	Uniform 5-honeycomb	0_{[6]}	δ_{6}	hδ_{6}	qδ_{6}	
E^{6}	Uniform 6-honeycomb	0_{[7]}	δ_{7}	hδ_{7}	qδ_{7}	2_{22}
E^{7}	Uniform 7-honeycomb	0_{[8]}	δ_{8}	hδ_{8}	qδ_{8}	1_{33} • 3_{31}
E^{8}	Uniform 8-honeycomb	0_{[9]}	δ_{9}	hδ_{9}	qδ_{9}	1_{52} • 2_{51} • 5_{21}
E^{9}	Uniform 9-honeycomb	0_{[10]}	δ_{10}	hδ_{10}	qδ_{10}	
E^{10}	Uniform 10-honeycomb	0_{[11]}	δ_{11}	hδ_{11}	qδ_{11}	
E^{n−1}	Uniform (n−1)-honeycomb	0_{[n]}	δ_{n}	hδ_{n}	qδ_{n}	1_{k2} • 2_{k1} • k_{21}
