= Runcitruncated tesseractic honeycomb =

Runcitruncated tesseractic honeycomb
(No image)
| Type | Uniform 4-honeycomb |
| Schläfli symbol | t_{0,1,3}{4,3,3,4} |
| Coxeter-Dynkin diagram | |
| 4-face type | t_{0,1,3}{4,3,3} t_{1}{3,4,3} t_{1}{3,4}×{} 4-8 duoprism |
| Cell type | Cuboctahedron Truncated cube Cube; Octagonal prism Triangular prism |
| Face type | {3}, {4}, {8} |
| Vertex figure | triangular prism-based tilted pyramid |
| Coxeter group | ${\tilde{C}}_4$ = [4,3,3,4] ${\tilde{B}}_4$ = [4,3,3^{1,1}] |
| Dual | |
| Properties | vertex-transitive |

In four-dimensional Euclidean geometry, the runcitruncated tesseractic honeycomb is a uniform space-filling tessellation (or honeycomb) in Euclidean 4-space.

== Related honeycombs ==
The [4,3,3,4],, Coxeter group generates 31 permutations of uniform tessellations, 21 with distinct symmetry and 20 with distinct geometry. The expanded tesseractic honeycomb (also known as the stericated tesseractic honeycomb) is geometrically identical to the tesseractic honeycomb. Three of the symmetric honeycombs are shared in the [3,4,3,3] family. Two alternations (13) and (17), and the quarter tesseractic (2) are repeated in other families.

C4 honeycombs
| Extended symmetry | Extended diagram | Order | Honeycombs |
|---|---|---|---|
| [4,3,3,4]: | | ×1 | _{1}, _{2}, _{3}, _{4}, _{5}, _{6}, _{7}, _{8}, _{9}, _{10}, _{11}, _{12}, _{13} |
| [[4,3,3,4]] | | ×2 | _{(1)}, _{(2)}, _{(13)}, _{18} _{(6)}, _{19}, _{20} |
| [(3,3)[1^{+},4,3,3,4,1^{+}]] ↔ [(3,3)[3^{1,1,1,1}]] ↔ [3,4,3,3] | ↔ ↔ | ×6 | _{14}, _{15}, _{16}, _{17} |

The [4,3,3^{1,1}],, Coxeter group generates 31 permutations of uniform tessellations, 23 with distinct symmetry and 4 with distinct geometry. There are two alternated forms: the alternations (19) and (24) have the same geometry as the 16-cell honeycomb and snub 24-cell honeycomb respectively.

B4 honeycombs
| Extended symmetry | Extended diagram | Order | Honeycombs |
|---|---|---|---|
| [4,3,3^{1,1}]: | | ×1 | _{5}, _{6}, _{7}, _{8} |
| <[4,3,3^{1,1}]>: ↔[4,3,3,4] | ↔ | ×2 | _{9}, _{10}, _{11}, _{12}, _{13}, _{14}, _{(10)}, _{15}, _{16}, _{(13)}, _{17}, _{18}, _{19} |
| [3[1^{+},4,3,3^{1,1}]] ↔ [3[3,3^{1,1,1}]] ↔ [3,3,4,3] | ↔ ↔ | ×3 | _{1}, _{2}, _{3}, _{4} |
| [(3,3)[1^{+},4,3,3^{1,1}]] ↔ [(3,3)[3^{1,1,1,1}]] ↔ [3,4,3,3] | ↔ ↔ | ×12 | _{20}, _{21}, _{22}, _{23} |

== See also ==
Regular and uniform honeycombs in 4-space:

- Tesseractic honeycomb
- Demitesseractic honeycomb
- 24-cell honeycomb
- Truncated 24-cell honeycomb
- Snub 24-cell honeycomb
- 5-cell honeycomb
- Truncated 5-cell honeycomb
- Omnitruncated 5-cell honeycomb

== Notes ==
Fundamental convex regular and uniform honeycombs in dimensions 2–9
| Space | Family | ${\tilde{A}}_{n-1}$ | ${\tilde{C}}_{n-1}$ | ${\tilde{B}}_{n-1}$ | ${\tilde{D}}_{n-1}$ | ${\tilde{G}}_2$ / ${\tilde{F}}_4$ / ${\tilde{E}}_{n-1}$ |
| E^{2} | Uniform tiling | 0_{[3]} | δ_{3} | hδ_{3} | qδ_{3} | Hexagonal |
| E^{3} | Uniform convex honeycomb | 0_{[4]} | δ_{4} | hδ_{4} | qδ_{4} | |
| E^{4} | Uniform 4-honeycomb | 0_{[5]} | δ_{5} | hδ_{5} | qδ_{5} | 24-cell honeycomb |
| E^{5} | Uniform 5-honeycomb | 0_{[6]} | δ_{6} | hδ_{6} | qδ_{6} | |
| E^{6} | Uniform 6-honeycomb | 0_{[7]} | δ_{7} | hδ_{7} | qδ_{7} | 2_{22} |
| E^{7} | Uniform 7-honeycomb | 0_{[8]} | δ_{8} | hδ_{8} | qδ_{8} | 1_{33} • 3_{31} |
| E^{8} | Uniform 8-honeycomb | 0_{[9]} | δ_{9} | hδ_{9} | qδ_{9} | 1_{52} • 2_{51} • 5_{21} |
| E^{9} | Uniform 9-honeycomb | 0_{[10]} | δ_{10} | hδ_{10} | qδ_{10} | |
| E^{10} | Uniform 10-honeycomb | 0_{[11]} | δ_{11} | hδ_{11} | qδ_{11} | |
| E^{n−1} | Uniform (n−1)-honeycomb | 0_{[n]} | δ_{n} | hδ_{n} | qδ_{n} | 1_{k2} • 2_{k1} • k_{21} |
