= Omnitruncated tesseractic honeycomb =

Geometric figure

omnitruncated tesseractic honeycomb
(No image)
Type	Uniform honeycomb
Schläfli symbol	t_{0,1,2,3,4}{4,3,3,4}
Coxeter diagram	
4-face type	Omnitruncated tesseract Truncated cuboctahedral prism 8-8 duoprism
Cell type	Truncated cuboctahedron Truncated octahedron Octagonal prism Hexagonal prism Cube
Face type	{4}, {6}, {8}
Vertex figure	irr. 5-cell
Coxeter groups	${\tilde{C}}_4$×2, [[4,3,3,4]]
Properties	Vertex transitive

In four-dimensional Euclidean geometry, the omnitruncated tesseractic honeycomb is a uniform space-filling honeycomb. It has omnitruncated tesseract, truncated cuboctahedral prism, and 8-8 duoprism facets in an irregular 5-cell vertex figure.

== Related honeycombs ==
The [4,3,3,4],, Coxeter group generates 31 permutations of uniform tessellations, 21 with distinct symmetry and 20 with distinct geometry. The expanded tesseractic honeycomb (also known as the stericated tesseractic honeycomb) is geometrically identical to the tesseractic honeycomb. Three of the symmetric honeycombs are shared in the [3,4,3,3] family. Two alternations (13) and (17), and the quarter tesseractic (2) are repeated in other families.

C4 honeycombs
Extended symmetry	Extended diagram	Order	Honeycombs
[4,3,3,4]:		×1	_{1}, _{2}, _{3}, _{4}, _{5}, _{6}, _{7}, _{8}, _{9}, _{10}, _{11}, _{12}, _{13}
[[4,3,3,4]]		×2	_{(1)}, _{(2)}, _{(13)}, _{18} _{(6)}, _{19}, _{20}
[(3,3)[1^{+},4,3,3,4,1^{+}]] ↔ [(3,3)[3^{1,1,1,1}]] ↔ [3,4,3,3]	↔ ↔	×6	_{14}, _{15}, _{16}, _{17}

== See also ==
- Truncated square tiling
- Omnitruncated cubic honeycomb

Regular and uniform honeycombs in 4-space:

- Tesseractic honeycomb
- 16-cell honeycomb
- 24-cell honeycomb
- Truncated 24-cell honeycomb
- Snub 24-cell honeycomb
- 5-cell honeycomb
- Truncated 5-cell honeycomb
- Omnitruncated 5-cell honeycomb

Fundamental convex regular and uniform honeycombs in dimensions 2–9
Space	Family	${\tilde{A}}_{n-1}$	${\tilde{C}}_{n-1}$	${\tilde{B}}_{n-1}$	${\tilde{D}}_{n-1}$	${\tilde{G}}_2$ / ${\tilde{F}}_4$ / ${\tilde{E}}_{n-1}$
E^{2}	Uniform tiling	0_{[3]}	δ_{3}	hδ_{3}	qδ_{3}	Hexagonal
E^{3}	Uniform convex honeycomb	0_{[4]}	δ_{4}	hδ_{4}	qδ_{4}	
E^{4}	Uniform 4-honeycomb	0_{[5]}	δ_{5}	hδ_{5}	qδ_{5}	24-cell honeycomb
E^{5}	Uniform 5-honeycomb	0_{[6]}	δ_{6}	hδ_{6}	qδ_{6}	
E^{6}	Uniform 6-honeycomb	0_{[7]}	δ_{7}	hδ_{7}	qδ_{7}	2_{22}
E^{7}	Uniform 7-honeycomb	0_{[8]}	δ_{8}	hδ_{8}	qδ_{8}	1_{33} • 3_{31}
E^{8}	Uniform 8-honeycomb	0_{[9]}	δ_{9}	hδ_{9}	qδ_{9}	1_{52} • 2_{51} • 5_{21}
E^{9}	Uniform 9-honeycomb	0_{[10]}	δ_{10}	hδ_{10}	qδ_{10}	
E^{10}	Uniform 10-honeycomb	0_{[11]}	δ_{11}	hδ_{11}	qδ_{11}	
E^{n−1}	Uniform (n−1)-honeycomb	0_{[n]}	δ_{n}	hδ_{n}	qδ_{n}	1_{k2} • 2_{k1} • k_{21}
