= Truncated tesseractic honeycomb =

Truncated tesseractic honeycomb
(No image)
Type	Uniform 4-honeycomb
Schläfli symbol	t{4,3,3,4} t{4,3,3^{1,1}}
Coxeter-Dynkin diagram	
4-face type	truncated tesseract 16-cell
Cell type	Truncated cube Tetrahedron
Face type	{3}, {8}
Vertex figure	octahedral pyramid
Coxeter group	${\tilde{C}}_4$ = [4,3,3,4] ${\tilde{B}}_4$ = [4,3,3^{1,1}]
Dual	
Properties	vertex-transitive

In four-dimensional Euclidean geometry, the truncated tesseractic honeycomb is a uniform space-filling tessellation (or honeycomb) in Euclidean 4-space. It is constructed by a truncation of a tesseractic honeycomb creating truncated tesseracts, and adding new 16-cell facets at the original vertices.

== Related honeycombs ==
The [4,3,3,4],, Coxeter group generates 31 permutations of uniform tessellations, 21 with distinct symmetry and 20 with distinct geometry. The expanded tesseractic honeycomb (also known as the stericated tesseractic honeycomb) is geometrically identical to the tesseractic honeycomb. Three of the symmetric honeycombs are shared in the [3,4,3,3] family. Two alternations (13) and (17), and the quarter tesseractic (2) are repeated in other families.

C4 honeycombs
Extended symmetry	Extended diagram	Order	Honeycombs
[4,3,3,4]:		×1	_{1}, _{2}, _{3}, _{4}, _{5}, _{6}, _{7}, _{8}, _{9}, _{10}, _{11}, _{12}, _{13}
[[4,3,3,4]]		×2	_{(1)}, _{(2)}, _{(13)}, _{18} _{(6)}, _{19}, _{20}
[(3,3)[1^{+},4,3,3,4,1^{+}]] ↔ [(3,3)[3^{1,1,1,1}]] ↔ [3,4,3,3]	↔ ↔	×6	_{14}, _{15}, _{16}, _{17}

== See also ==
Regular and uniform honeycombs in 4-space:

- Tesseractic honeycomb
- Demitesseractic honeycomb
- 24-cell honeycomb
- Truncated 24-cell honeycomb
- Snub 24-cell honeycomb
- 5-cell honeycomb
- Truncated 5-cell honeycomb
- Omnitruncated 5-cell honeycomb

== Notes ==
Fundamental convex regular and uniform honeycombs in dimensions 2–9
Space	Family	${\tilde{A}}_{n-1}$	${\tilde{C}}_{n-1}$	${\tilde{B}}_{n-1}$	${\tilde{D}}_{n-1}$	${\tilde{G}}_2$ / ${\tilde{F}}_4$ / ${\tilde{E}}_{n-1}$
E^{2}	Uniform tiling	0_{[3]}	δ_{3}	hδ_{3}	qδ_{3}	Hexagonal
E^{3}	Uniform convex honeycomb	0_{[4]}	δ_{4}	hδ_{4}	qδ_{4}	
E^{4}	Uniform 4-honeycomb	0_{[5]}	δ_{5}	hδ_{5}	qδ_{5}	24-cell honeycomb
E^{5}	Uniform 5-honeycomb	0_{[6]}	δ_{6}	hδ_{6}	qδ_{6}	
E^{6}	Uniform 6-honeycomb	0_{[7]}	δ_{7}	hδ_{7}	qδ_{7}	2_{22}
E^{7}	Uniform 7-honeycomb	0_{[8]}	δ_{8}	hδ_{8}	qδ_{8}	1_{33} • 3_{31}
E^{8}	Uniform 8-honeycomb	0_{[9]}	δ_{9}	hδ_{9}	qδ_{9}	1_{52} • 2_{51} • 5_{21}
E^{9}	Uniform 9-honeycomb	0_{[10]}	δ_{10}	hδ_{10}	qδ_{10}	
E^{10}	Uniform 10-honeycomb	0_{[11]}	δ_{11}	hδ_{11}	qδ_{11}	
E^{n−1}	Uniform (n−1)-honeycomb	0_{[n]}	δ_{n}	hδ_{n}	qδ_{n}	1_{k2} • 2_{k1} • k_{21}
