= Rectified tesseractic honeycomb =

Tessalating shape in four dimensional space

quarter tesseractic honeycomb
(No image)
Type	Uniform 4-honeycomb
Family	Quarter hypercubic honeycomb
Schläfli symbol	r{4,3,3,4} r{4,3^{1,1}} r{4,3^{1,1}} q{4,3,3,4}
Coxeter-Dynkin diagram	= = = =
4-face type	h{4,3^{2}}, h_{3}{4,3^{2}},
Cell type	{3,3}, t_{1}{4,3},
Face type	{3} {4}
Edge figure	Square pyramid
Vertex figure	Elongated {3,4}×{}
Coxeter group	${\tilde{C}}_4$ = [4,3,3,4] ${\tilde{B}}_4$ = [4,3^{1,1}] ${\tilde{D}}_4$ = [3^{1,1,1,1}]
Dual	
Properties	vertex-transitive

In four-dimensional Euclidean geometry, the rectified tesseractic honeycomb is a uniform space-filling tessellation (or honeycomb) in Euclidean 4-space. It is constructed by a rectification of a tesseractic honeycomb which creates new vertices on the middle of all the original edges, rectifying the cells into rectified tesseracts, and adding new 16-cell facets at the original vertices. Its vertex figure is an octahedral prism, {3,4}×{}.

It is also called a quarter tesseractic honeycomb since it has half the vertices of the 4-demicubic honeycomb, and a quarter of the vertices of a tesseractic honeycomb.

== Related honeycombs ==
The [4,3,3,4],, Coxeter group generates 31 permutations of uniform tessellations, 21 with distinct symmetry and 20 with distinct geometry. The expanded tesseractic honeycomb (also known as the stericated tesseractic honeycomb) is geometrically identical to the tesseractic honeycomb. Three of the symmetric honeycombs are shared in the [3,4,3,3] family. Two alternations (13) and (17), and the quarter tesseractic (2) are repeated in other families.

C4 honeycombs
Extended symmetry	Extended diagram	Order	Honeycombs
[4,3,3,4]:		×1	_{1}, _{2}, _{3}, _{4}, _{5}, _{6}, _{7}, _{8}, _{9}, _{10}, _{11}, _{12}, _{13}
[[4,3,3,4]]		×2	_{(1)}, _{(2)}, _{(13)}, _{18} _{(6)}, _{19}, _{20}
[(3,3)[1^{+},4,3,3,4,1^{+}]] ↔ [(3,3)[3^{1,1,1,1}]] ↔ [3,4,3,3]	↔ ↔	×6	_{14}, _{15}, _{16}, _{17}

The [4,3,3^{1,1}],, Coxeter group generates 31 permutations of uniform tessellations, 23 with distinct symmetry and 4 with distinct geometry. There are two alternated forms: the alternations (19) and (24) have the same geometry as the 16-cell honeycomb and snub 24-cell honeycomb respectively.

B4 honeycombs
Extended symmetry	Extended diagram	Order	Honeycombs
[4,3,3^{1,1}]:		×1	_{5}, _{6}, _{7}, _{8}
<[4,3,3^{1,1}]>: ↔[4,3,3,4]	↔	×2	_{9}, _{10}, _{11}, _{12}, _{13}, _{14}, _{(10)}, _{15}, _{16}, _{(13)}, _{17}, _{18}, _{19}
[3[1^{+},4,3,3^{1,1}]] ↔ [3[3,3^{1,1,1}]] ↔ [3,3,4,3]	↔ ↔	×3	_{1}, _{2}, _{3}, _{4}
[(3,3)[1^{+},4,3,3^{1,1}]] ↔ [(3,3)[3^{1,1,1,1}]] ↔ [3,4,3,3]	↔ ↔	×12	_{20}, _{21}, _{22}, _{23}

There are ten uniform honeycombs constructed by the ${\tilde{D}}_4$ Coxeter group, all repeated in other families by extended symmetry, seen in the graph symmetry of rings in the Coxeter–Dynkin diagrams. The 10th is constructed as an alternation. As subgroups in Coxeter notation: [3,4,(3,3)^{*}] (index 24), [3,3,4,3^{*}] (index 6), [1^{+},4,3,3,4,1^{+}] (index 4), [3^{1,1},3,4,1^{+}] (index 2) are all isomorphic to [3^{1,1,1,1}].

The ten permutations are listed with its highest extended symmetry relation:

D4 honeycombs
Extended symmetry	Extended diagram	Extended group	Honeycombs
[3^{1,1,1,1}]		${\tilde{D}}_4$	(none)
<[3^{1,1,1,1}]> ↔ [3^{1,1},3,4]	↔	${\tilde{D}}_4$×2 = ${\tilde{B}}_4$	(none)
<2[^{1,1}3^{1,1}]> ↔ [4,3,3,4]	↔	${\tilde{D}}_4$×4 = ${\tilde{C}}_4$	_{1}, _{2}
[3[3,3^{1,1,1}]] ↔ [3,3,4,3]	↔	${\tilde{D}}_4$×6 = ${\tilde{F}}_4$	_{3}, _{4}, _{5}, _{6}
[4[^{1,1}3^{1,1}]] ↔ [[4,3,3,4]]	↔	${\tilde{D}}_4$×8 = ${\tilde{C}}_4$×2	_{7}, _{8}, _{9}
[(3,3)[3^{1,1,1,1}]] ↔ [3,4,3,3]	↔	${\tilde{D}}_4$×24 = ${\tilde{F}}_4$	_{7}, _{8}, _{9}
[(3,3)[3^{1,1,1,1}]]^{+} ↔ [3^{+},4,3,3]	↔	½${\tilde{D}}_4$×24 = ½${\tilde{F}}_4$	_{10}

== See also ==
Regular and uniform honeycombs in 4-space:

- Tesseractic honeycomb
- Demitesseractic honeycomb
- 24-cell honeycomb
- Truncated 24-cell honeycomb
- Snub 24-cell honeycomb
- 5-cell honeycomb
- Truncated 5-cell honeycomb
- Omnitruncated 5-cell honeycomb

== Notes ==
Fundamental convex regular and uniform honeycombs in dimensions 2–9
Space	Family	${\tilde{A}}_{n-1}$	${\tilde{C}}_{n-1}$	${\tilde{B}}_{n-1}$	${\tilde{D}}_{n-1}$	${\tilde{G}}_2$ / ${\tilde{F}}_4$ / ${\tilde{E}}_{n-1}$
E^{2}	Uniform tiling	0_{[3]}	δ_{3}	hδ_{3}	qδ_{3}	Hexagonal
E^{3}	Uniform convex honeycomb	0_{[4]}	δ_{4}	hδ_{4}	qδ_{4}	
E^{4}	Uniform 4-honeycomb	0_{[5]}	δ_{5}	hδ_{5}	qδ_{5}	24-cell honeycomb
E^{5}	Uniform 5-honeycomb	0_{[6]}	δ_{6}	hδ_{6}	qδ_{6}	
E^{6}	Uniform 6-honeycomb	0_{[7]}	δ_{7}	hδ_{7}	qδ_{7}	2_{22}
E^{7}	Uniform 7-honeycomb	0_{[8]}	δ_{8}	hδ_{8}	qδ_{8}	1_{33} • 3_{31}
E^{8}	Uniform 8-honeycomb	0_{[9]}	δ_{9}	hδ_{9}	qδ_{9}	1_{52} • 2_{51} • 5_{21}
E^{9}	Uniform 9-honeycomb	0_{[10]}	δ_{10}	hδ_{10}	qδ_{10}	
E^{10}	Uniform 10-honeycomb	0_{[11]}	δ_{11}	hδ_{11}	qδ_{11}	
E^{n−1}	Uniform (n−1)-honeycomb	0_{[n]}	δ_{n}	hδ_{n}	qδ_{n}	1_{k2} • 2_{k1} • k_{21}
