= Uniform tessellation =

A uniform tessellation may be:

- A uniform tiling in two dimensions
- A uniform honeycomb in higher dimensions
