= Truncated 24-cell honeycomb =

Truncated 24-cell honeycomb
(No image)
Type	Uniform 4-honeycomb
Schläfli symbol	t{3,4,3,3} tr{3,3,4,3} t2r{4,3,3,4} t2r{4,3,3^{1,1}} t{3^{1,1,1,1}}
Coxeter-Dynkin diagrams	
4-face type	Tesseract; Truncated 24-cell
Cell type	Cube; Truncated octahedron
Face type	Square; Triangle
Vertex figure	Tetrahedral pyramid
Coxeter groups	${\tilde{F}}_4$, [3,4,3,3] ${\tilde{B}}_4$, [4,3,3^{1,1}] ${\tilde{C}}_4$, [4,3,3,4] ${\tilde{D}}_4$, [3^{1,1,1,1}]
Properties	Vertex transitive

In four-dimensional Euclidean geometry, the truncated 24-cell honeycomb is a uniform space-filling honeycomb. It can be seen as a truncation of the regular 24-cell honeycomb, containing tesseract and truncated 24-cell cells.

It has a uniform alternation, called the snub 24-cell honeycomb. It is a snub from the ${\tilde{D}}_4$ construction. This truncated 24-cell has Schläfli symbol t{3^{1,1,1,1}}, and its snub is represented as s{3^{1,1,1,1}}.

== Alternate names ==
- Truncated icositetrachoric tetracomb
- Truncated icositetrachoric honeycomb
- Cantitruncated 16-cell honeycomb
- Bicantitruncated tesseractic honeycomb

== Symmetry constructions ==
There are five different symmetry constructions of this tessellation. Each symmetry can be represented by different arrangements of colored truncated 24-cell facets. In all cases, four truncated 24-cells, and one tesseract meet at each vertex, but the vertex figures have different symmetry generators.

Coxeter group	Coxeter diagram	Facets	Vertex figure	Vertex figure symmetry (order)
${\tilde{F}}_4$ = [3,4,3,3]		4: 1:		, [3,3] (24)
${\tilde{F}}_4$ = [3,3,4,3]		3: 1: 1:		, [3] (6)
${\tilde{C}}_4$ = [4,3,3,4]		2,2: 1:		, [2] (4)
${\tilde{B}}_4$ = [3^{1,1},3,4]		1,1: 2: 1:		, [ ] (2)
${\tilde{D}}_4$ = [3^{1,1,1,1}]		1,1,1,1: 1:		[ ]^{+} (1)

== See also ==
Regular and uniform honeycombs in 4-space:

- Tesseractic honeycomb
- 16-cell honeycomb
- 24-cell honeycomb
- Rectified 24-cell honeycomb
- Snub 24-cell honeycomb
- 5-cell honeycomb
- Truncated 5-cell honeycomb
- Omnitruncated 5-cell honeycomb

Fundamental convex regular and uniform honeycombs in dimensions 2–9
Space	Family	${\tilde{A}}_{n-1}$	${\tilde{C}}_{n-1}$	${\tilde{B}}_{n-1}$	${\tilde{D}}_{n-1}$	${\tilde{G}}_2$ / ${\tilde{F}}_4$ / ${\tilde{E}}_{n-1}$
E^{2}	Uniform tiling	0_{[3]}	δ_{3}	hδ_{3}	qδ_{3}	Hexagonal
E^{3}	Uniform convex honeycomb	0_{[4]}	δ_{4}	hδ_{4}	qδ_{4}	
E^{4}	Uniform 4-honeycomb	0_{[5]}	δ_{5}	hδ_{5}	qδ_{5}	24-cell honeycomb
E^{5}	Uniform 5-honeycomb	0_{[6]}	δ_{6}	hδ_{6}	qδ_{6}	
E^{6}	Uniform 6-honeycomb	0_{[7]}	δ_{7}	hδ_{7}	qδ_{7}	2_{22}
E^{7}	Uniform 7-honeycomb	0_{[8]}	δ_{8}	hδ_{8}	qδ_{8}	1_{33} • 3_{31}
E^{8}	Uniform 8-honeycomb	0_{[9]}	δ_{9}	hδ_{9}	qδ_{9}	1_{52} • 2_{51} • 5_{21}
E^{9}	Uniform 9-honeycomb	0_{[10]}	δ_{10}	hδ_{10}	qδ_{10}	
E^{10}	Uniform 10-honeycomb	0_{[11]}	δ_{11}	hδ_{11}	qδ_{11}	
E^{n-1}	Uniform (n-1)-honeycomb	0_{[n]}	δ_{n}	hδ_{n}	qδ_{n}	1_{k2} • 2_{k1} • k_{21}
