= Snub 24-cell honeycomb =

Snub 24-cell honeycomb
(No image)
Type	Uniform 4-honeycomb
Schläfli symbols	s{3,4,3,3} sr{3,3,4,3} 2sr{4,3,3,4} 2sr{4,3,3^{1,1}} s{3^{1,1,1,1}}
Coxeter diagrams	=
4-face type	snub 24-cell 16-cell 5-cell
Cell type	{3,3} {3,5}
Face type	triangle {3}
Vertex figure	Irregular decachoron
Symmetries	[3^{+},4,3,3] [3,4,(3,3)^{+}] [4,(3,3)^{+},4] [4,(3,3^{1,1})^{+}] [3^{1,1,1,1}]^{+}
Properties	Vertex transitive, nonWythoffian

In four-dimensional Euclidean geometry, the snub 24-cell honeycomb, or snub icositetrachoric honeycomb is a uniform space-filling tessellation (or honeycomb) by snub 24-cells, 16-cells, and 5-cells. It was discovered by Thorold Gosset with his 1900 paper of semiregular polytopes. It is not semiregular by Gosset's definition of regular facets, but all of its cells (ridges) are regular, either tetrahedra or icosahedra.

It can be seen as an alternation of a truncated 24-cell honeycomb, and can be represented by Schläfli symbol s{3,4,3,3}, s{3^{1,1,1,1}}, and 3 other snub constructions.

It is defined by an irregular decachoron vertex figure (10-celled 4-polytope), faceted by four snub 24-cells, one 16-cell, and five 5-cells. The vertex figure can be seen topologically as a modified tetrahedral prism, where one of the tetrahedra is subdivided at mid-edges into a central octahedron and four corner tetrahedra. Then the four side-facets of the prism, the triangular prisms become tridiminished icosahedra.

== Symmetry constructions ==
There are five different symmetry constructions of this tessellation. Each symmetry can be represented by different arrangements of colored snub 24-cell, 16-cell, and 5-cell facets. In all cases, four snub 24-cells, five 5-cells, and one 16-cell meet at each vertex, but the vertex figures have different symmetry generators.

Symmetry	Coxeter Schläfli	Facets (on vertex figure)		
Symmetry	Coxeter Schläfli	Snub 24-cell (4)	16-cell (1)	5-cell (5)
[3^{+},4,3,3]	s{3,4,3,3}	4:		
[3,4,(3,3)^{+}]	sr{3,3,4,3}	3: 1:		
[[4,(3,3)^{+},4]]	2sr{4,3,3,4}	2,2:		
[(3^{1,1},3)^{+},4]	2sr{4,3,3^{1,1}}	1,1: 2:		
[3^{1,1,1,1}]^{+}	s{3^{1,1,1,1}}	1,1,1,1:		

== See also ==
Regular and uniform honeycombs in 4-space:

- Tesseractic honeycomb
- 16-cell honeycomb
- 24-cell honeycomb
- Truncated 24-cell honeycomb
- 5-cell honeycomb
- Truncated 5-cell honeycomb
- Omnitruncated 5-cell honeycomb

Fundamental convex regular and uniform honeycombs in dimensions 2–9
Space	Family	${\tilde{A}}_{n-1}$	${\tilde{C}}_{n-1}$	${\tilde{B}}_{n-1}$	${\tilde{D}}_{n-1}$	${\tilde{G}}_2$ / ${\tilde{F}}_4$ / ${\tilde{E}}_{n-1}$
E^{2}	Uniform tiling	0_{[3]}	δ_{3}	hδ_{3}	qδ_{3}	Hexagonal
E^{3}	Uniform convex honeycomb	0_{[4]}	δ_{4}	hδ_{4}	qδ_{4}	
E^{4}	Uniform 4-honeycomb	0_{[5]}	δ_{5}	hδ_{5}	qδ_{5}	24-cell honeycomb
E^{5}	Uniform 5-honeycomb	0_{[6]}	δ_{6}	hδ_{6}	qδ_{6}	
E^{6}	Uniform 6-honeycomb	0_{[7]}	δ_{7}	hδ_{7}	qδ_{7}	2_{22}
E^{7}	Uniform 7-honeycomb	0_{[8]}	δ_{8}	hδ_{8}	qδ_{8}	1_{33} • 3_{31}
E^{8}	Uniform 8-honeycomb	0_{[9]}	δ_{9}	hδ_{9}	qδ_{9}	1_{52} • 2_{51} • 5_{21}
E^{9}	Uniform 9-honeycomb	0_{[10]}	δ_{10}	hδ_{10}	qδ_{10}	
E^{10}	Uniform 10-honeycomb	0_{[11]}	δ_{11}	hδ_{11}	qδ_{11}	
E^{n-1}	Uniform (n-1)-honeycomb	0_{[n]}	δ_{n}	hδ_{n}	qδ_{n}	1_{k2} • 2_{k1} • k_{21}
