= 16-cell honeycomb =

Tessellation in 4D Euclidean geometry

16-cell honeycomb
Perspective projection: the first layer of adjacent 16-cell facets
Type	Regular 4-honeycomb Uniform 4-honeycomb
Family	Alternated hypercube honeycomb
Schläfli symbol	{3,3,4,3}
Coxeter diagrams	= =
4-face type	{3,3,4}
Cell type	{3,3}
Face type	{3}
Edge figure	cube
Vertex figure	24-cell
Coxeter group	${\tilde{F}}_4$ = [3,3,4,3]
Dual	{3,4,3,3}
Properties	vertex-transitive, edge-transitive, face-transitive, cell-transitive, 4-face-transitive

In four-dimensional Euclidean geometry, the 16-cell honeycomb is one of the three regular space-filling tessellations (or honeycombs), represented by Schläfli symbol {3,3,4,3}, and constructed by a 4-dimensional packing of 16-cell facets, three around every (triangular) face.

Its dual is the 24-cell honeycomb. Its vertex figure is a 24-cell. The vertex arrangement is called the B_{4}, D_{4}, or F_{4} lattice.

== Alternate names ==
- Hexadecachoric tetracomb/honeycomb
- Demitesseractic tetracomb/honeycomb

== Coordinates ==
Vertices can be placed at all integer coordinates (i,j,k,l), such that the sum of the coordinates is even.

== D_{4} lattice ==
The vertex arrangement of the 16-cell honeycomb is called the D_{4} lattice or F_{4} lattice. The vertices of this lattice are the centers of the 3-spheres in the densest known packing of equal spheres in 4-space; its kissing number is 24, which is also the same as the kissing number in R^{4}, as proved by Oleg Musin in 2003.

The related D^{+}_{4} lattice (also called D^{2}_{4}) can be constructed by the union of two D_{4} lattices, and is identical to the C_{4} lattice:

∪ = =

The kissing number for D^{+}_{4} is 2^{3} = 8, (2^{n − 1} for n < 8, 240 for n = 8, and 2n(n − 1) for n > 8).

The related D^{*}_{4} lattice (also called D^{4}_{4} and C^{2}_{4}) can be constructed by the union of all four D_{4} lattices, but it is identical to the D_{4} lattice: It is also the 4-dimensional body centered cubic, the union of two 4-cube honeycombs in dual positions.

∪ ∪ ∪ = = ∪.

The kissing number of the D^{*}_{4} lattice (and D_{4} lattice) is 24 and its Voronoi tessellation is a 24-cell honeycomb,, containing all rectified 16-cells (24-cell) Voronoi cells, or.

== Symmetry constructions ==
There are three different symmetry constructions of this tessellation. Each symmetry can be represented by different arrangements of colored 16-cell facets.

Coxeter group	Schläfli symbol	Coxeter diagram	Vertex figure Symmetry	Facets/verf
${\tilde{F}}_4$ = [3,3,4,3]	{3,3,4,3}		[3,4,3], order 1152	24: 16-cell
${\tilde{B}}_4$ = [3^{1,1},3,4]	= h{4,3,3,4}	=	[3,3,4], order 384	16+8: 16-cell
${\tilde{D}}_4$ = [3^{1,1,1,1}]	{3,3^{1,1,1}} = h{4,3,3^{1,1}}	=	[3^{1,1,1}], order 192	8+8+8: 16-cell
2×½${\tilde{C}}_4$ = [[(4,3,3,4,2^{+})]]	ht_{0,4}{4,3,3,4}			8+4+4: 4-demicube 8: 16-cell

== Related honeycombs ==
It is related to the regular hyperbolic 5-space 5-orthoplex honeycomb, {3,3,3,4,3}, with 5-orthoplex facets, the regular 4-polytope 24-cell, {3,4,3} with octahedral (3-orthoplex) cell, and cube {4,3}, with (2-orthoplex) square faces.

It has a 2-dimensional analogue, {3,6}, and as an alternated form (the demitesseractic honeycomb, h{4,3,3,4}) it is related to the alternated cubic honeycomb.

This honeycomb is one of 20 uniform honeycombs constructed by the ${\tilde{D}}_5$ Coxeter group, all but 3 repeated in other families by extended symmetry, seen in the graph symmetry of rings in the Coxeter–Dynkin diagrams. The 20 permutations are listed with its highest extended symmetry relation:

D5 honeycombs
Extended symmetry	Extended diagram	Extended group	Honeycombs
[3^{1,1},3,3^{1,1}]		${\tilde{D}}_5$	
<[3^{1,1},3,3^{1,1}]> ↔ [3^{1,1},3,3,4]	↔	${\tilde{D}}_5$×2_{1} = ${\tilde{B}}_5$	,,,,,,
[[3^{1,1},3,3^{1,1}]]		${\tilde{D}}_5$×2_{2}	,
<2[3^{1,1},3,3^{1,1}]> ↔ [4,3,3,3,4]	↔	${\tilde{D}}_5$×4_{1} = ${\tilde{C}}_5$	,,,,,
[<2[3^{1,1},3,3^{1,1}]>] ↔ [[4,3,3,3,4]]	↔	${\tilde{D}}_5$×8 = ${\tilde{C}}_5$×2	,,

== See also ==
Regular and uniform honeycombs in 4-space:

- Tesseractic honeycomb
- 24-cell honeycomb
- Truncated 24-cell honeycomb
- Snub 24-cell honeycomb
- 5-cell honeycomb
- Truncated 5-cell honeycomb
- Omnitruncated 5-cell honeycomb

== Notes ==
Fundamental convex regular and uniform honeycombs in dimensions 2–9
Space	Family	${\tilde{A}}_{n-1}$	${\tilde{C}}_{n-1}$	${\tilde{B}}_{n-1}$	${\tilde{D}}_{n-1}$	${\tilde{G}}_2$ / ${\tilde{F}}_4$ / ${\tilde{E}}_{n-1}$
E^{2}	Uniform tiling	0_{[3]}	δ_{3}	hδ_{3}	qδ_{3}	Hexagonal
E^{3}	Uniform convex honeycomb	0_{[4]}	δ_{4}	hδ_{4}	qδ_{4}	
E^{4}	Uniform 4-honeycomb	0_{[5]}	δ_{5}	hδ_{5}	qδ_{5}	24-cell honeycomb
E^{5}	Uniform 5-honeycomb	0_{[6]}	δ_{6}	hδ_{6}	qδ_{6}	
E^{6}	Uniform 6-honeycomb	0_{[7]}	δ_{7}	hδ_{7}	qδ_{7}	2_{22}
E^{7}	Uniform 7-honeycomb	0_{[8]}	δ_{8}	hδ_{8}	qδ_{8}	1_{33} • 3_{31}
E^{8}	Uniform 8-honeycomb	0_{[9]}	δ_{9}	hδ_{9}	qδ_{9}	1_{52} • 2_{51} • 5_{21}
E^{9}	Uniform 9-honeycomb	0_{[10]}	δ_{10}	hδ_{10}	qδ_{10}	
E^{10}	Uniform 10-honeycomb	0_{[11]}	δ_{11}	hδ_{11}	qδ_{11}	
E^{n−1}	Uniform (n−1)-honeycomb	0_{[n]}	δ_{n}	hδ_{n}	qδ_{n}	1_{k2} • 2_{k1} • k_{21}
