= 6-cubic honeycomb =

6-cubic honeycomb
(no image)
Type	Regular 6-honeycomb Uniform 6-honeycomb
Family	Hypercube honeycomb
Schläfli symbol	{4,3^{4},4} {4,3^{3},3^{1,1}}
Coxeter-Dynkin diagrams	
6-face type	{4,3^{4}}
5-face type	{4,3^{3}}
4-face type	{4,3,3}
Cell type	{4,3}
Face type	{4}
Face figure	{4,3} (octahedron)
Edge figure	8 {4,3,3} (16-cell)
Vertex figure	64 {4,3^{4}} (6-orthoplex)
Coxeter group	${\tilde{C}}_6$, [4,3^{4},4] ${\tilde{B}}_6$, [4,3^{3},3^{1,1}]
Dual	self-dual
Properties	vertex-transitive, edge-transitive, face-transitive, cell-transitive

The 6-cubic honeycomb or hexeractic honeycomb is the only regular space-filling tessellation (or honeycomb) in Euclidean 6-space.

It is analogous to the square tiling of the plane and to the cubic honeycomb of 3-space.

== Constructions ==
There are many different Wythoff constructions of this honeycomb. The most symmetric form is regular, with Schläfli symbol {4,3^{4},4}. Another form has two alternating 6-cube facets (like a checkerboard) with Schläfli symbol {4,3^{3},3^{1,1}}. The lowest symmetry Wythoff construction has 64 types of facets around each vertex and a prismatic product Schläfli symbol {∞}^{(6)}.

== Related honeycombs ==
The [4,3^{4},4],, Coxeter group generates 127 permutations of uniform tessellations, 71 with unique symmetry and 70 with unique geometry. The expanded 6-cubic honeycomb is geometrically identical to the 6-cubic honeycomb.

The 6-cubic honeycomb can be alternated into the 6-demicubic honeycomb, replacing the 6-cubes with 6-demicubes, and the alternated gaps are filled by 6-orthoplex facets.

=== Trirectified 6-cubic honeycomb ===
A trirectified 6-cubic honeycomb,, contains all birectified 6-orthoplex facets and is the Voronoi tessellation of the D_{6}^{*} lattice. Facets can be identically colored from a doubled ${\tilde{C}}_6$×2, [4,3^{4},4] symmetry, alternately colored from ${\tilde{C}}_6$, [4,3^{4},4] symmetry, three colors from ${\tilde{B}}_6$, [4,3^{3},3^{1,1}] symmetry, and 4 colors from ${\tilde{D}}_6$, [3^{1,1},3,3,3^{1,1}] symmetry.

== See also ==
- List of regular polytopes

Fundamental convex regular and uniform honeycombs in dimensions 2–9
Space	Family	${\tilde{A}}_{n-1}$	${\tilde{C}}_{n-1}$	${\tilde{B}}_{n-1}$	${\tilde{D}}_{n-1}$	${\tilde{G}}_2$ / ${\tilde{F}}_4$ / ${\tilde{E}}_{n-1}$
E^{2}	Uniform tiling	0_{[3]}	δ_{3}	hδ_{3}	qδ_{3}	Hexagonal
E^{3}	Uniform convex honeycomb	0_{[4]}	δ_{4}	hδ_{4}	qδ_{4}	
E^{4}	Uniform 4-honeycomb	0_{[5]}	δ_{5}	hδ_{5}	qδ_{5}	24-cell honeycomb
E^{5}	Uniform 5-honeycomb	0_{[6]}	δ_{6}	hδ_{6}	qδ_{6}	
E^{6}	Uniform 6-honeycomb	0_{[7]}	δ_{7}	hδ_{7}	qδ_{7}	2_{22}
E^{7}	Uniform 7-honeycomb	0_{[8]}	δ_{8}	hδ_{8}	qδ_{8}	1_{33} • 3_{31}
E^{8}	Uniform 8-honeycomb	0_{[9]}	δ_{9}	hδ_{9}	qδ_{9}	1_{52} • 2_{51} • 5_{21}
E^{9}	Uniform 9-honeycomb	0_{[10]}	δ_{10}	hδ_{10}	qδ_{10}	
E^{10}	Uniform 10-honeycomb	0_{[11]}	δ_{11}	hδ_{11}	qδ_{11}	
E^{n−1}	Uniform (n−1)-honeycomb	0_{[n]}	δ_{n}	hδ_{n}	qδ_{n}	1_{k2} • 2_{k1} • k_{21}
