= 5-simplex honeycomb =

5-simplex honeycomb
(No image)
| Type | Uniform 5-honeycomb |
| Family | Simplectic honeycomb |
| Schläfli symbol | {3^{[6]}} = 0_{[6]} |
| Coxeter diagram | |
| 5-face types | {3^{4}}, t_{1}{3^{4}} t_{2}{3^{4}} |
| 4-face types | {3^{3}}, t_{1}{3^{3}} |
| Cell types | {3,3}, t_{1}{3,3} |
| Face types | {3} |
| Vertex figure | t_{0,4}{3^{4}} |
| Coxeter groups | ${\tilde{A}}_5$×2, <[3^{[6]}]> |
| Properties | vertex-transitive |

In five-dimensional Euclidean geometry, the 5-simplex honeycomb or hexateric honeycomb is a space-filling tessellation (or honeycomb or pentacomb). Each vertex is shared by 12 5-simplexes, 30 rectified 5-simplexes, and 20 birectified 5-simplexes. These facet types occur in proportions of 2:2:1 respectively in the whole honeycomb.

== A5 lattice ==
This vertex arrangement is called the A_{5} lattice or 5-simplex lattice. The 30 vertices of the stericated 5-simplex vertex figure represent the 30 roots of the ${\tilde{A}}_5$ Coxeter group. It is the 5-dimensional case of a simplectic honeycomb.

The A^{2}_{5} lattice is the union of two A_{5} lattices:

∪

The A^{3}_{5} is the union of three A_{5} lattices:

∪ ∪.

The A^{*}_{5} lattice (also called A^{6}_{5}) is the union of six A_{5} lattices, and is the dual vertex arrangement to the omnitruncated 5-simplex honeycomb, and therefore the Voronoi cell of this lattice is an omnitruncated 5-simplex.

∪ ∪ ∪ ∪ ∪ = dual of

== Related polytopes and honeycombs ==
This honeycomb is one of 12 unique uniform honeycombs constructed by the ${\tilde{A}}_5$ Coxeter group. The extended symmetry of the hexagonal diagram of the ${\tilde{A}}_5$ Coxeter group allows for automorphisms that map diagram nodes (mirrors) on to each other. So the various 12 honeycombs represent higher symmetries based on the ring arrangement symmetry in the diagrams:

A5 honeycombs
| Hexagon symmetry | Extended symmetry | Extended diagram | Extended group | Honeycomb diagrams |
|---|---|---|---|---|
| a1 | [3^{[6]}] | | ${\tilde{A}}_5$ | |
| d2 | <[3^{[6]}]> | | ${\tilde{A}}_5$×2_{1} | _{1},,,, |
| p2 | [[3^{[6]}]] | | ${\tilde{A}}_5$×2_{2} | _{2}, |
| i4 | [<[3^{[6]}]>] | | ${\tilde{A}}_5$×2_{1}×2_{2} | , |
| d6 | <3[3^{[6]}]> | | ${\tilde{A}}_5$×6_{1} | |
| r12 | [6[3^{[6]}]] | | ${\tilde{A}}_5$×12 | _{3} |

== Projection by folding ==
The 5-simplex honeycomb can be projected into the 3-dimensional cubic honeycomb by a geometric folding operation that maps two pairs of mirrors into each other, sharing the same vertex arrangement:

| ${\tilde{A}}_5$ |
| ${\tilde{C}}_3$ |

== See also ==
Regular and uniform honeycombs in 5-space:

- 5-cubic honeycomb
- 5-demicube honeycomb
- Truncated 5-simplex honeycomb
- Omnitruncated 5-simplex honeycomb

== Notes ==
Fundamental convex regular and uniform honeycombs in dimensions 2–9
| Space | Family | ${\tilde{A}}_{n-1}$ | ${\tilde{C}}_{n-1}$ | ${\tilde{B}}_{n-1}$ | ${\tilde{D}}_{n-1}$ | ${\tilde{G}}_2$ / ${\tilde{F}}_4$ / ${\tilde{E}}_{n-1}$ |
| E^{2} | Uniform tiling | 0_{[3]} | δ_{3} | hδ_{3} | qδ_{3} | Hexagonal |
| E^{3} | Uniform convex honeycomb | 0_{[4]} | δ_{4} | hδ_{4} | qδ_{4} | |
| E^{4} | Uniform 4-honeycomb | 0_{[5]} | δ_{5} | hδ_{5} | qδ_{5} | 24-cell honeycomb |
| E^{5} | Uniform 5-honeycomb | 0_{[6]} | δ_{6} | hδ_{6} | qδ_{6} | |
| E^{6} | Uniform 6-honeycomb | 0_{[7]} | δ_{7} | hδ_{7} | qδ_{7} | 2_{22} |
| E^{7} | Uniform 7-honeycomb | 0_{[8]} | δ_{8} | hδ_{8} | qδ_{8} | 1_{33} • 3_{31} |
| E^{8} | Uniform 8-honeycomb | 0_{[9]} | δ_{9} | hδ_{9} | qδ_{9} | 1_{52} • 2_{51} • 5_{21} |
| E^{9} | Uniform 9-honeycomb | 0_{[10]} | δ_{10} | hδ_{10} | qδ_{10} | |
| E^{10} | Uniform 10-honeycomb | 0_{[11]} | δ_{11} | hδ_{11} | qδ_{11} | |
| E^{n-1} | Uniform (n-1)-honeycomb | 0_{[n]} | δ_{n} | hδ_{n} | qδ_{n} | 1_{k2} • 2_{k1} • k_{21} |
