= Quarter hypercubic honeycomb =

In geometry, the quarter hypercubic honeycomb (or quarter n-cubic honeycomb) is a dimensional infinite series of honeycombs, based on the hypercube honeycomb. It is given a Schläfli symbol q{4,3...3,4} or Coxeter symbol qδ_{4} representing the regular form with three quarters of the vertices removed and containing the symmetry of Coxeter group ${\tilde{D}}_{n-1}$ for n ≥ 5, with ${\tilde{D}}_4$ = ${\tilde{A}}_4$ and for quarter n-cubic honeycombs ${\tilde{D}}_5$ = ${\tilde{B}}_5$.

qδ_{n}	Name	Schläfli symbol	Coxeter diagrams	Facets			Vertex figure
qδ_{3}	quarter square tiling	q{4,4}	or or	h{4}={2}	{ }×{ }		{ }×{ }
qδ_{4}	quarter cubic honeycomb	q{4,3,4}	or or	h{4,3}	h_{2}{4,3}		Elongated triangular antiprism
qδ_{5}	quarter tesseractic honeycomb	q{4,3^{2},4}	or or	h{4,3^{2}}	h_{3}{4,3^{2}}		{3,4}×{}
qδ_{6}	quarter 5-cubic honeycomb	q{4,3^{3},4}		h{4,3^{3}}	h_{4}{4,3^{3}}		Rectified 5-cell antiprism
qδ_{7}	quarter 6-cubic honeycomb	q{4,3^{4},4}		h{4,3^{4}}	h_{5}{4,3^{4}}	{3,3}×{3,3}	
qδ_{8}	quarter 7-cubic honeycomb	q{4,3^{5},4}		h{4,3^{5}}	h_{6}{4,3^{5}}	{3,3}×{3,3^{1,1}}	
qδ_{9}	quarter 8-cubic honeycomb	q{4,3^{6},4}		h{4,3^{6}}	h_{7}{4,3^{6}}	{3,3}×{3,3^{2,1}} {3,3^{1,1}}×{3,3^{1,1}}	
qδ_{n}	quarter n-cubic honeycomb	q{4,3^{n−3},4}	...	h{4,3^{n−2}}	h_{n−2}{4,3^{n−2}}	...	

== See also ==
- Hypercubic honeycomb
- Alternated hypercubic honeycomb
- Simplectic honeycomb
- Truncated simplectic honeycomb
- Omnitruncated simplectic honeycomb

Fundamental convex regular and uniform honeycombs in dimensions 2–9
Space	Family	${\tilde{A}}_{n-1}$	${\tilde{C}}_{n-1}$	${\tilde{B}}_{n-1}$	${\tilde{D}}_{n-1}$	${\tilde{G}}_2$ / ${\tilde{F}}_4$ / ${\tilde{E}}_{n-1}$
E^{2}	Uniform tiling	0_{[3]}	δ_{3}	hδ_{3}	qδ_{3}	Hexagonal
E^{3}	Uniform convex honeycomb	0_{[4]}	δ_{4}	hδ_{4}	qδ_{4}	
E^{4}	Uniform 4-honeycomb	0_{[5]}	δ_{5}	hδ_{5}	qδ_{5}	24-cell honeycomb
E^{5}	Uniform 5-honeycomb	0_{[6]}	δ_{6}	hδ_{6}	qδ_{6}	
E^{6}	Uniform 6-honeycomb	0_{[7]}	δ_{7}	hδ_{7}	qδ_{7}	2_{22}
E^{7}	Uniform 7-honeycomb	0_{[8]}	δ_{8}	hδ_{8}	qδ_{8}	1_{33} • 3_{31}
E^{8}	Uniform 8-honeycomb	0_{[9]}	δ_{9}	hδ_{9}	qδ_{9}	1_{52} • 2_{51} • 5_{21}
E^{9}	Uniform 9-honeycomb	0_{[10]}	δ_{10}	hδ_{10}	qδ_{10}	
E^{10}	Uniform 10-honeycomb	0_{[11]}	δ_{11}	hδ_{11}	qδ_{11}	
E^{n−1}	Uniform (n−1)-honeycomb	0_{[n]}	δ_{n}	hδ_{n}	qδ_{n}	1_{k2} • 2_{k1} • k_{21}
