= 1 52 honeycomb =

1_{52} honeycomb
(No image)
Type	Uniform tessellation
Family	1_{k2} polytope
Schläfli symbol	{3,3^{5,2}}
Coxeter symbol	1_{52}
Coxeter-Dynkin diagram	
8-face types	1_{42} 1_{51}
7-face types	1_{32} 1_{41}
6-face types	1_{22} {3^{1,3,1}} {3^{5}}
5-face types	1_{21} {3^{4}}
4-face type	1_{11} {3^{3}}
Cells	{3^{2}}
Faces	{3}
Vertex figure	birectified 8-simplex: t_{2}{3^{7}}
Coxeter group	${\tilde{E}}_8$, [3^{5,2,1}]

In geometry, the 1_{52} honeycomb is a uniform tessellation of 8-dimensional Euclidean space. It contains 1_{42} and 1_{51} facets, in a birectified 8-simplex vertex figure. It is the final figure in the 1_{k2} polytope family.

== Construction ==
It is created by a Wythoff construction upon a set of 9 hyperplane mirrors in 8-dimensional space.

The facet information can be extracted from its Coxeter-Dynkin diagram.

Removing the node on the end of the 2-length branch leaves the 8-demicube, 1_{51}.

Removing the node on the end of the 5-length branch leaves the 1_{42}.

The vertex figure is determined by removing the ringed node and ringing the neighboring node. This makes the birectified 8-simplex, 0_{52}.

== Related polytopes and honeycombs ==
1_{k2} figures in n dimensions
Space	Finite						Euclidean	Hyperbolic
n	3	4	5	6	7	8	9	10
Coxeter group	E_{3}=A_{2}A_{1}	E_{4}=A_{4}	E_{5}=D_{5}	E_{6}	E_{7}	E_{8}	E_{9} = ${\tilde{E}}_{8}$ = E_{8}^{+}	E_{10} = ${\bar{T}}_8$ = E_{8}^{++}
Coxeter diagram								
Symmetry (order)	[3^{−1,2,1}]	[3^{0,2,1}]	[3^{1,2,1}]	[[3^{2,2,1}]]	[3^{3,2,1}]	[3^{4,2,1}]	[3^{5,2,1}]	[3^{6,2,1}]
Order	12	120	1,920	103,680	2,903,040	696,729,600	∞	
Graph							-	-
Name	1_{−1,2}	1_{02}	1_{12}	1_{22}	1_{32}	1_{42}	1_{52}	1_{62}

== See also ==
- 5_{21} honeycomb
- 2_{51} honeycomb

Fundamental convex regular and uniform honeycombs in dimensions 2–9
Space	Family	${\tilde{A}}_{n-1}$	${\tilde{C}}_{n-1}$	${\tilde{B}}_{n-1}$	${\tilde{D}}_{n-1}$	${\tilde{G}}_2$ / ${\tilde{F}}_4$ / ${\tilde{E}}_{n-1}$
E^{2}	Uniform tiling	0_{[3]}	δ_{3}	hδ_{3}	qδ_{3}	Hexagonal
E^{3}	Uniform convex honeycomb	0_{[4]}	δ_{4}	hδ_{4}	qδ_{4}	
E^{4}	Uniform 4-honeycomb	0_{[5]}	δ_{5}	hδ_{5}	qδ_{5}	24-cell honeycomb
E^{5}	Uniform 5-honeycomb	0_{[6]}	δ_{6}	hδ_{6}	qδ_{6}	
E^{6}	Uniform 6-honeycomb	0_{[7]}	δ_{7}	hδ_{7}	qδ_{7}	2_{22}
E^{7}	Uniform 7-honeycomb	0_{[8]}	δ_{8}	hδ_{8}	qδ_{8}	1_{33} • 3_{31}
E^{8}	Uniform 8-honeycomb	0_{[9]}	δ_{9}	hδ_{9}	qδ_{9}	1_{52} • 2_{51} • 5_{21}
E^{9}	Uniform 9-honeycomb	0_{[10]}	δ_{10}	hδ_{10}	qδ_{10}	
E^{10}	Uniform 10-honeycomb	0_{[11]}	δ_{11}	hδ_{11}	qδ_{11}	
E^{n−1}	Uniform (n−1)-honeycomb	0_{[n]}	δ_{n}	hδ_{n}	qδ_{n}	1_{k2} • 2_{k1} • k_{21}
