= 2 51 honeycomb =

Eight-dimensional geometric tessellation

2_{51} honeycomb
(No image)
| Type | Uniform tessellation |
| Family | 2_{k1} polytope |
| Schläfli symbol | {3,3,3^{5,1}} |
| Coxeter symbol | 2_{51} |
| Coxeter-Dynkin diagram | |
| 8-face types | 2_{41} {3^{7}} |
| 7-face types | 2_{31} {3^{6}} |
| 6-face types | 2_{21} {3^{5}} |
| 5-face types | 2_{11} {3^{4}} |
| 4-face type | {3^{3}} |
| Cells | {3^{2}} |
| Faces | {3} |
| Vertex figure | 1_{51} |
| Edge figure | 0_{51} |
| Coxeter group | ${\tilde{E}}_8$, [3^{5,2,1}] |

In 8-dimensional geometry, the 2_{51} honeycomb is a space-filling uniform tessellation. It is composed of 2_{41} polytope and 8-simplex facets arranged in an 8-demicube vertex figure. It is the final figure in the 2_{k1} family.

== Construction ==
It is created by a Wythoff construction upon a set of 9 hyperplane mirrors in 8-dimensional space.

The facet information can be extracted from its Coxeter-Dynkin diagram.

Removing the node on the short branch leaves the 8-simplex.

Removing the node on the end of the 5-length branch leaves the 2_{41}.

The vertex figure is determined by removing the ringed node and ringing the neighboring node. This makes the 8-demicube, 1_{51}.

The edge figure is the vertex figure of the vertex figure. This makes the rectified 7-simplex, 0_{51}.

== Related polytopes and honeycombs ==
2_{k1} figures in n dimensions
| Space | Finite | | | | | | Euclidean | Hyperbolic |
| n | 3 | 4 | 5 | 6 | 7 | 8 | 9 | 10 |
|---|---|---|---|---|---|---|---|---|
| Coxeter group | E_{3}=A_{2}A_{1} | E_{4}=A_{4} | E_{5}=D_{5} | E_{6} | E_{7} | E_{8} | E_{9} = ${\tilde{E}}_{8}$ = E_{8}^{+} | E_{10} = ${\bar{T}}_8$ = E_{8}^{++} |
| Coxeter diagram | | | | | | | | |
| Symmetry | [3^{−1,2,1}] | [3^{0,2,1}] | [[3^{1,2,1}]] | [3^{2,2,1}] | [3^{3,2,1}] | [3^{4,2,1}] | [3^{5,2,1}] | [3^{6,2,1}] |
| Order | 12 | 120 | 384 | 51,840 | 2,903,040 | 696,729,600 | ∞ | |
| Graph | | | | | | | - | - |
| Name | 2_{−1,1} | 2_{01} | 2_{11} | 2_{21} | 2_{31} | 2_{41} | 2_{51} | 2_{61} |

Fundamental convex regular and uniform honeycombs in dimensions 2–9
| Space | Family | ${\tilde{A}}_{n-1}$ | ${\tilde{C}}_{n-1}$ | ${\tilde{B}}_{n-1}$ | ${\tilde{D}}_{n-1}$ | ${\tilde{G}}_2$ / ${\tilde{F}}_4$ / ${\tilde{E}}_{n-1}$ |
| E^{2} | Uniform tiling | 0_{[3]} | δ_{3} | hδ_{3} | qδ_{3} | Hexagonal |
| E^{3} | Uniform convex honeycomb | 0_{[4]} | δ_{4} | hδ_{4} | qδ_{4} | |
| E^{4} | Uniform 4-honeycomb | 0_{[5]} | δ_{5} | hδ_{5} | qδ_{5} | 24-cell honeycomb |
| E^{5} | Uniform 5-honeycomb | 0_{[6]} | δ_{6} | hδ_{6} | qδ_{6} | |
| E^{6} | Uniform 6-honeycomb | 0_{[7]} | δ_{7} | hδ_{7} | qδ_{7} | 2_{22} |
| E^{7} | Uniform 7-honeycomb | 0_{[8]} | δ_{8} | hδ_{8} | qδ_{8} | 1_{33} • 3_{31} |
| E^{8} | Uniform 8-honeycomb | 0_{[9]} | δ_{9} | hδ_{9} | qδ_{9} | 1_{52} • 2_{51} • 5_{21} |
| E^{9} | Uniform 9-honeycomb | 0_{[10]} | δ_{10} | hδ_{10} | qδ_{10} | |
| E^{10} | Uniform 10-honeycomb | 0_{[11]} | δ_{11} | hδ_{11} | qδ_{11} | |
| E^{n−1} | Uniform (n−1)-honeycomb | 0_{[n]} | δ_{n} | hδ_{n} | qδ_{n} | 1_{k2} • 2_{k1} • k_{21} |
