= 5-demicubic honeycomb =

Type of uniform space-filling tessellation

Demipenteractic honeycomb
(No image)
Type	Uniform 5-honeycomb
Family	Alternated hypercubic honeycomb
Schläfli symbols	h{4,3,3,3,4} h{4,3,3,3^{1,1}} ht_{0,5}{4,3,3,3,4} h{4,3,3,4}h{∞} h{4,3,3^{1,1}}h{∞} ht_{0,4}{4,3,3,4}h{∞} h{4,3,4}h{∞}h{∞} h{4,3^{1,1}}h{∞}h{∞}
Coxeter diagrams	= =
Facets	{3,3,3,4} h{4,3,3,3}
Vertex figure	t_{1}{3,3,3,4}
Coxeter group	${\tilde{B}}_5$ [4,3,3,3^{1,1}] ${\tilde{D}}_5$ [3^{1,1},3,3^{1,1}]

The 5-demicube honeycomb (or demipenteractic honeycomb) is a uniform space-filling tessellation (or honeycomb) in Euclidean 5-space. It is constructed as an alternation of the regular 5-cube honeycomb.

It is the first tessellation in the demihypercube honeycomb family which, with all the next ones, is not regular, being composed of two different types of uniform facets. The 5-cubes become alternated into 5-demicubes h{4,3,3,3} and the alternated vertices create 5-orthoplex {3,3,3,4} facets.

== D5 lattice ==
The vertex arrangement of the 5-demicubic honeycomb is the D_{5} lattice which is the densest known sphere packing in 5 dimensions. The 40 vertices of the rectified 5-orthoplex vertex figure of the 5-demicubic honeycomb reflect the kissing number 40 of this lattice.

The D^{+}_{5} packing (also called D^{2}_{5}) can be constructed by the union of two D_{5} lattices. The analogous packings form lattices only in even dimensions. The kissing number is 2^{4}=16 (2^{n−1} for n<8, 240 for n=8, and 2n(n−1) for n>8).

∪

The D^{*}_{5} lattice (also called D^{4}_{5} and C^{2}_{5}) can be constructed by the union of all four 5-demicubic lattices: It is also the 5-dimensional body centered cubic, the union of two 5-cube honeycombs in dual positions.

∪ ∪ ∪ = ∪.

The kissing number of the D^{*}_{5} lattice is 10 (2n for n≥5) and its Voronoi tessellation is a tritruncated 5-cubic honeycomb,, containing all bitruncated 5-orthoplex, Voronoi cells.

== Symmetry constructions ==
There are three uniform construction symmetries of this tessellation. Each symmetry can be represented by arrangements of different colors on the 32 5-demicube facets around each vertex.

Coxeter group	Schläfli symbol	Coxeter-Dynkin diagram	Vertex figure Symmetry	Facets/verf
${\tilde{B}}_5$ = [3^{1,1},3,3,4] = [1^{+},4,3,3,4]	h{4,3,3,3,4}	=	[3,3,3,4]	32: 5-demicube 10: 5-orthoplex
${\tilde{D}}_5$ = [3^{1,1},3,3^{1,1}] = [1^{+},4,3,3^{1,1}]	h{4,3,3,3^{1,1}}	=	[3^{2,1,1}]	16+16: 5-demicube 10: 5-orthoplex
2×½${\tilde{C}}_5$ = [[(4,3,3,3,4,2^{+})]]	ht_{0,5}{4,3,3,3,4}			16+8+8: 5-demicube 10: 5-orthoplex

== Related honeycombs ==
This honeycomb is one of 20 uniform honeycombs constructed by the ${\tilde{D}}_5$ Coxeter group, all but 3 repeated in other families by extended symmetry, seen in the graph symmetry of rings in the Coxeter–Dynkin diagrams. The 20 permutations are listed with its highest extended symmetry relation:

D5 honeycombs
Extended symmetry	Extended diagram	Extended group	Honeycombs
[3^{1,1},3,3^{1,1}]		${\tilde{D}}_5$	
<[3^{1,1},3,3^{1,1}]> ↔ [3^{1,1},3,3,4]	↔	${\tilde{D}}_5$×2_{1} = ${\tilde{B}}_5$	,,,,,,
[[3^{1,1},3,3^{1,1}]]		${\tilde{D}}_5$×2_{2}	,
<2[3^{1,1},3,3^{1,1}]> ↔ [4,3,3,3,4]	↔	${\tilde{D}}_5$×4_{1} = ${\tilde{C}}_5$	,,,,,
[<2[3^{1,1},3,3^{1,1}]>] ↔ [[4,3,3,3,4]]	↔	${\tilde{D}}_5$×8 = ${\tilde{C}}_5$×2	,,

== See also ==
- Uniform polytope

Regular and uniform honeycombs in 5-space:

- 5-cube honeycomb
- 5-demicube honeycomb
- 5-simplex honeycomb
- Truncated 5-simplex honeycomb
- Omnitruncated 5-simplex honeycomb

Fundamental convex regular and uniform honeycombs in dimensions 2–9
Space	Family	${\tilde{A}}_{n-1}$	${\tilde{C}}_{n-1}$	${\tilde{B}}_{n-1}$	${\tilde{D}}_{n-1}$	${\tilde{G}}_2$ / ${\tilde{F}}_4$ / ${\tilde{E}}_{n-1}$
E^{2}	Uniform tiling	0_{[3]}	δ_{3}	hδ_{3}	qδ_{3}	Hexagonal
E^{3}	Uniform convex honeycomb	0_{[4]}	δ_{4}	hδ_{4}	qδ_{4}	
E^{4}	Uniform 4-honeycomb	0_{[5]}	δ_{5}	hδ_{5}	qδ_{5}	24-cell honeycomb
E^{5}	Uniform 5-honeycomb	0_{[6]}	δ_{6}	hδ_{6}	qδ_{6}	
E^{6}	Uniform 6-honeycomb	0_{[7]}	δ_{7}	hδ_{7}	qδ_{7}	2_{22}
E^{7}	Uniform 7-honeycomb	0_{[8]}	δ_{8}	hδ_{8}	qδ_{8}	1_{33} • 3_{31}
E^{8}	Uniform 8-honeycomb	0_{[9]}	δ_{9}	hδ_{9}	qδ_{9}	1_{52} • 2_{51} • 5_{21}
E^{9}	Uniform 9-honeycomb	0_{[10]}	δ_{10}	hδ_{10}	qδ_{10}	
E^{10}	Uniform 10-honeycomb	0_{[11]}	δ_{11}	hδ_{11}	qδ_{11}	
E^{n−1}	Uniform (n−1)-honeycomb	0_{[n]}	δ_{n}	hδ_{n}	qδ_{n}	1_{k2} • 2_{k1} • k_{21}
