= 6-simplex honeycomb =

6-simplex honeycomb
(No image)
Type	Uniform 6-honeycomb
Family	Simplectic honeycomb
Schläfli symbol	{3^{[7]}} = 0_{[7]}
Coxeter diagram	
6-face types	{3^{5}}, t_{1}{3^{5}} t_{2}{3^{5}}
5-face types	{3^{4}}, t_{1}{3^{4}} t_{2}{3^{4}}
4-face types	{3^{3}}, t_{1}{3^{3}}
Cell types	{3,3}, t_{1}{3,3}
Face types	{3}
Vertex figure	t_{0,5}{3^{5}}
Symmetry	${\tilde{A}}_6$×2, [[3^{[7]}]]
Properties	vertex-transitive

In six-dimensional Euclidean geometry, the 6-simplex honeycomb is a space-filling tessellation (or honeycomb). The tessellation fills space by 6-simplex, rectified 6-simplex, and birectified 6-simplex facets. These facet types occur in proportions of 1:1:1 respectively in the whole honeycomb.

== A6 lattice ==
This vertex arrangement is called the A6 lattice or 6-simplex lattice. The 42 vertices of the expanded 6-simplex vertex figure represent the 42 roots of the ${\tilde{A}}_6$ Coxeter group. It is the 6-dimensional case of a simplectic honeycomb. Around each vertex figure are 126 facets: 7+7 6-simplex, 21+21 rectified 6-simplex, 35+35 birectified 6-simplex, with the count distribution from the 8th row of Pascal's triangle.

The A^{*}_{6} lattice (also called A^{7}_{6}) is the union of seven A_{6} lattices, and has the vertex arrangement of the dual to the omnitruncated 6-simplex honeycomb, and therefore the Voronoi cell of this lattice is the omnitruncated 6-simplex.

∪ ∪ ∪ ∪ ∪ ∪ = dual of

== Related polytopes and honeycombs ==
This honeycomb is one of 17 unique uniform honeycombs constructed by the ${\tilde{A}}_6$ Coxeter group, grouped by their extended symmetry of the Coxeter–Dynkin diagrams:

A6 honeycombs
Heptagon symmetry	Extended symmetry	Extended diagram	Extended group	Honeycombs
a1	[3^{[7]}]		${\tilde{A}}_6$	
i2	[[3^{[7]}]]		${\tilde{A}}_6$×2	_{1} _{2}
r14	[7[3^{[7]}]]		${\tilde{A}}_6$×14	_{3}

== Projection by folding ==
The 6-simplex honeycomb can be projected into the 3-dimensional cubic honeycomb by a geometric folding operation that maps two pairs of mirrors into each other, sharing the same vertex arrangement:

${\tilde{A}}_6$
${\tilde{C}}_3$

== See also ==
Regular and uniform honeycombs in 6-space:

- 6-cubic honeycomb
- 6-demicubic honeycomb
- Truncated 6-simplex honeycomb
- Omnitruncated 6-simplex honeycomb
- 2_{22} honeycomb

== Notes ==
Fundamental convex regular and uniform honeycombs in dimensions 2–9
Space	Family	${\tilde{A}}_{n-1}$	${\tilde{C}}_{n-1}$	${\tilde{B}}_{n-1}$	${\tilde{D}}_{n-1}$	${\tilde{G}}_2$ / ${\tilde{F}}_4$ / ${\tilde{E}}_{n-1}$
E^{2}	Uniform tiling	0_{[3]}	δ_{3}	hδ_{3}	qδ_{3}	Hexagonal
E^{3}	Uniform convex honeycomb	0_{[4]}	δ_{4}	hδ_{4}	qδ_{4}	
E^{4}	Uniform 4-honeycomb	0_{[5]}	δ_{5}	hδ_{5}	qδ_{5}	24-cell honeycomb
E^{5}	Uniform 5-honeycomb	0_{[6]}	δ_{6}	hδ_{6}	qδ_{6}	
E^{6}	Uniform 6-honeycomb	0_{[7]}	δ_{7}	hδ_{7}	qδ_{7}	2_{22}
E^{7}	Uniform 7-honeycomb	0_{[8]}	δ_{8}	hδ_{8}	qδ_{8}	1_{33} • 3_{31}
E^{8}	Uniform 8-honeycomb	0_{[9]}	δ_{9}	hδ_{9}	qδ_{9}	1_{52} • 2_{51} • 5_{21}
E^{9}	Uniform 9-honeycomb	0_{[10]}	δ_{10}	hδ_{10}	qδ_{10}	
E^{10}	Uniform 10-honeycomb	0_{[11]}	δ_{11}	hδ_{11}	qδ_{11}	
E^{n-1}	Uniform (n-1)-honeycomb	0_{[n]}	δ_{n}	hδ_{n}	qδ_{n}	1_{k2} • 2_{k1} • k_{21}
