= Simplicial honeycomb =

Tiling of n-dimensional space

${\tilde{A}}_2$	${\tilde{A}}_3$
Triangular tiling	Tetrahedral-octahedral honeycomb
With red and yellow equilateral triangles	With cyan and yellow tetrahedra, and red rectified tetrahedra (octahedra)

In geometry, the simplicial honeycomb (or n-simplex honeycomb) is a dimensional infinite series of honeycombs, based on the ${\tilde{A}}_n$ affine Coxeter group symmetry. It is represented by a Coxeter-Dynkin diagram as a cyclic graph of n + 1 nodes with one node ringed. It is composed of n-simplex facets, along with all rectified n-simplices. It can be thought of as an n-dimensional hypercubic honeycomb that has been subdivided along all hyperplanes $x+y+\cdots\in\mathbb{Z}$, then stretched along its main diagonal until the simplices on the ends of the hypercubes become regular. The vertex figure of an n-simplex honeycomb is an expanded n-simplex.

In 2 dimensions, the honeycomb represents the triangular tiling, with Coxeter graph filling the plane with alternately colored triangles. In 3 dimensions it represents the tetrahedral-octahedral honeycomb, with Coxeter graph filling space with alternately tetrahedral and octahedral cells. In 4 dimensions it is called the 5-cell honeycomb, with Coxeter graph, with 5-cell and rectified 5-cell facets. In 5 dimensions it is called the 5-simplex honeycomb, with Coxeter graph, filling space by 5-simplex, rectified 5-simplex, and birectified 5-simplex facets. In 6 dimensions it is called the 6-simplex honeycomb, with Coxeter graph, filling space by 6-simplex, rectified 6-simplex, and birectified 6-simplex facets.

== By dimension ==
n	${\tilde{A}}_{2+}$	Tessellation	Vertex figure	Facets per vertex figure	Vertices per vertex figure	Edge figure
1	${\tilde{A}}_1$	Apeirogon	Line segment	2	2	Point
2	${\tilde{A}}_2$	Triangular tiling 2-simplex honeycomb	Hexagon (Truncated triangle)	3+3 triangles	6	Line segment
3	${\tilde{A}}_3$	Tetrahedral-octahedral honeycomb 3-simplex honeycomb	Cuboctahedron (Cantellated tetrahedron)	4+4 tetrahedra 6 rectified tetrahedra	12	Rectangle
4	${\tilde{A}}_4$	4-simplex honeycomb	Runcinated 5-cell	5+5 5-cells 10+10 rectified 5-cells	20	Triangular antiprism
5	${\tilde{A}}_5$	5-simplex honeycomb	Stericated 5-simplex	6+6 5-simplex 15+15 rectified 5-simplex 20 birectified 5-simplex	30	Tetrahedral antiprism
6	${\tilde{A}}_6$	6-simplex honeycomb	Pentellated 6-simplex	7+7 6-simplex 21+21 rectified 6-simplex 35+35 birectified 6-simplex	42	4-simplex antiprism
7	${\tilde{A}}_7$	7-simplex honeycomb	Hexicated 7-simplex	8+8 7-simplex 28+28 rectified 7-simplex 56+56 birectified 7-simplex 70 trirectified 7-simplex	56	5-simplex antiprism
8	${\tilde{A}}_8$	8-simplex honeycomb	Heptellated 8-simplex	9+9 8-simplex 36+36 rectified 8-simplex 84+84 birectified 8-simplex 126+126 trirectified 8-simplex	72	6-simplex antiprism
9	${\tilde{A}}_9$	9-simplex honeycomb	Octellated 9-simplex	10+10 9-simplex 45+45 rectified 9-simplex 120+120 birectified 9-simplex 210+210 trirectified 9-simplex 252 quadrirectified 9-simplex	90	7-simplex antiprism
10	${\tilde{A}}_{10}$	10-simplex honeycomb	Ennecated 10-simplex	11+11 10-simplex 55+55 rectified 10-simplex 165+165 birectified 10-simplex 330+330 trirectified 10-simplex 462+462 quadrirectified 10-simplex	110	8-simplex antiprism
11	${\tilde{A}}_{11}$	11-simplex honeycomb	...	...	...	...

== Projection by folding ==
The (2n−1)-simplex honeycombs and 2n-simplex honeycombs can be projected into the n-dimensional hypercubic honeycomb by a geometric folding operation that maps two pairs of mirrors into each other, sharing the same vertex arrangement:

${\tilde{A}}_2$	${\tilde{A}}_4$	${\tilde{A}}_6$	${\tilde{A}}_8$	${\tilde{A}}_{10}$	...
${\tilde{A}}_3$	${\tilde{A}}_3$	${\tilde{A}}_5$	${\tilde{A}}_7$	${\tilde{A}}_9$	...
${\tilde{C}}_1$	${\tilde{C}}_2$	${\tilde{C}}_3$	${\tilde{C}}_4$	${\tilde{C}}_5$	...

== Kissing number ==
These honeycombs, seen as tangent n-spheres located at the center of each honeycomb vertex have a fixed number of contacting spheres and correspond to the number of vertices in the vertex figure. This represents the highest kissing number for 2 and 3 dimensions, but falls short on higher dimensions. In 2-dimensions, the triangular tiling defines a circle packing of 6 tangent spheres arranged in a regular hexagon, and for 3 dimensions there are 12 tangent spheres arranged in a cuboctahedral configuration. For 4 to 8 dimensions, the kissing numbers are 20, 30, 42, 56, and 72 spheres, while the greatest solutions are 24, 40, 72, 126, and 240 spheres respectively.

== See also ==
- Hypercubic honeycomb
- Alternated hypercubic honeycomb
- Quarter hypercubic honeycomb
- Truncated simplicial honeycomb
- Omnitruncated simplicial honeycomb

Fundamental convex regular and uniform honeycombs in dimensions 2–9
Space	Family	${\tilde{A}}_{n-1}$	${\tilde{C}}_{n-1}$	${\tilde{B}}_{n-1}$	${\tilde{D}}_{n-1}$	${\tilde{G}}_2$ / ${\tilde{F}}_4$ / ${\tilde{E}}_{n-1}$
E^{2}	Uniform tiling	0_{[3]}	δ_{3}	hδ_{3}	qδ_{3}	Hexagonal
E^{3}	Uniform convex honeycomb	0_{[4]}	δ_{4}	hδ_{4}	qδ_{4}	
E^{4}	Uniform 4-honeycomb	0_{[5]}	δ_{5}	hδ_{5}	qδ_{5}	24-cell honeycomb
E^{5}	Uniform 5-honeycomb	0_{[6]}	δ_{6}	hδ_{6}	qδ_{6}	
E^{6}	Uniform 6-honeycomb	0_{[7]}	δ_{7}	hδ_{7}	qδ_{7}	2_{22}
E^{7}	Uniform 7-honeycomb	0_{[8]}	δ_{8}	hδ_{8}	qδ_{8}	1_{33} • 3_{31}
E^{8}	Uniform 8-honeycomb	0_{[9]}	δ_{9}	hδ_{9}	qδ_{9}	1_{52} • 2_{51} • 5_{21}
E^{9}	Uniform 9-honeycomb	0_{[10]}	δ_{10}	hδ_{10}	qδ_{10}	
E^{10}	Uniform 10-honeycomb	0_{[11]}	δ_{11}	hδ_{11}	qδ_{11}	
E^{n−1}	Uniform (n−1)-honeycomb	0_{[n]}	δ_{n}	hδ_{n}	qδ_{n}	1_{k2} • 2_{k1} • k_{21}
