= Alternated hypercubic honeycomb =

Family of regular tessellations in geometry

An alternated square tiling or checkerboard pattern. or	An expanded square tiling.
A partially filled alternated cubic honeycomb with tetrahedral and octahedral cells. or	A subsymmetry colored alternated cubic honeycomb.

In geometry, the alternated hypercube honeycomb (or demicubic honeycomb) is a dimensional infinite series of honeycombs, based on the hypercube honeycomb with an alternation operation. It is given a Schläfli symbol h{4,3...3,4} representing the regular form with half the vertices removed and containing the symmetry of Coxeter group ${\tilde{B}}_{n-1}$ for n ≥ 4. A lower symmetry form ${\tilde{D}}_{n-1}$ can be created by removing another mirror on an order-4 peak.

The alternated hypercube facets become demihypercubes, and the deleted vertices create new orthoplex facets. The vertex figure for honeycombs of this family are rectified orthoplexes. In the four-dimensional case, the demihypercube and the orthoplex are the same (both are the 16-cell), and the rectified orthoplex is also regular (the 24-cell), so the 4-demicubic honeycomb is regular (the 16-cell honeycomb).

These are also named as hδ_{n} for an (n−1)-dimensional honeycomb.

hδ_{n}	Name	Schläfli symbol	Symmetry family	
hδ_{n}	Name	Schläfli symbol	${\tilde{B}}_{n-1}$ [4,3^{n−4},3^{1,1}]	${\tilde{D}}_{n-1}$ [3^{1,1},3^{n−5},3^{1,1}]
hδ_{n}	Name	Schläfli symbol	Coxeter-Dynkin diagrams by family	
hδ_{2}	Apeirogon	{∞}		
hδ_{3}	Alternated square tiling (Same as {4,4})	h{4,4}=t_{1}{4,4} t_{0,2}{4,4}		
hδ_{4}	Alternated cubic honeycomb	h{4,3,4} {3^{1,1},4}		
hδ_{5}	16-cell tetracomb (Same as {3,3,4,3})	h{4,3^{2},4} {3^{1,1},3,4} {3^{1,1,1,1}}		
hδ_{6}	5-demicube honeycomb	h{4,3^{3},4} {3^{1,1},3^{2},4} {3^{1,1},3,3^{1,1}}		
hδ_{7}	6-demicube honeycomb	h{4,3^{4},4} {3^{1,1},3^{3},4} {3^{1,1},3^{2},3^{1,1}}		
hδ_{8}	7-demicube honeycomb	h{4,3^{5},4} {3^{1,1},3^{4},4} {3^{1,1},3^{3},3^{1,1}}		
hδ_{9}	8-demicube honeycomb	h{4,3^{6},4} {3^{1,1},3^{5},4} {3^{1,1},3^{4},3^{1,1}}		
hδ_{n+1}	n-demicubic honeycomb	h{4,3^{n-2},4} {3^{1,1},3^{n-3},4} {3^{1,1},3^{n-4},3^{1,1}}	...	

== See also ==
- Hypercubic honeycomb
- Simplicial honeycomb

Fundamental convex regular and uniform honeycombs in dimensions 2–9
Space	Family	${\tilde{A}}_{n-1}$	${\tilde{C}}_{n-1}$	${\tilde{B}}_{n-1}$	${\tilde{D}}_{n-1}$	${\tilde{G}}_2$ / ${\tilde{F}}_4$ / ${\tilde{E}}_{n-1}$
E^{2}	Uniform tiling	0_{[3]}	δ_{3}	hδ_{3}	qδ_{3}	Hexagonal
E^{3}	Uniform convex honeycomb	0_{[4]}	δ_{4}	hδ_{4}	qδ_{4}	
E^{4}	Uniform 4-honeycomb	0_{[5]}	δ_{5}	hδ_{5}	qδ_{5}	24-cell honeycomb
E^{5}	Uniform 5-honeycomb	0_{[6]}	δ_{6}	hδ_{6}	qδ_{6}	
E^{6}	Uniform 6-honeycomb	0_{[7]}	δ_{7}	hδ_{7}	qδ_{7}	2_{22}
E^{7}	Uniform 7-honeycomb	0_{[8]}	δ_{8}	hδ_{8}	qδ_{8}	1_{33} • 3_{31}
E^{8}	Uniform 8-honeycomb	0_{[9]}	δ_{9}	hδ_{9}	qδ_{9}	1_{52} • 2_{51} • 5_{21}
E^{9}	Uniform 9-honeycomb	0_{[10]}	δ_{10}	hδ_{10}	qδ_{10}	
E^{10}	Uniform 10-honeycomb	0_{[11]}	δ_{11}	hδ_{11}	qδ_{11}	
E^{n−1}	Uniform (n−1)-honeycomb	0_{[n]}	δ_{n}	hδ_{n}	qδ_{n}	1_{k2} • 2_{k1} • k_{21}
