= 6-demicubic honeycomb =

6-demicubic honeycomb
(No image)
Type	Uniform 6-honeycomb
Family	Alternated hypercube honeycomb
Schläfli symbol	h{4,3,3,3,3,4} h{4,3,3,3,3^{1,1}} ht_{0,6}{4,3,3,3,3,4}
Coxeter diagram	= =
Facets	{3,3,3,3,4} h{4,3,3,3,3}
Vertex figure	r{3,3,3,3,4}
Coxeter group	${\tilde{B}}_6$ [4,3,3,3,3^{1,1}] ${\tilde{D}}_6$ [3^{1,1},3,3,3^{1,1}]

The 6-demicubic honeycomb or demihexeractic honeycomb is a uniform space-filling tessellation (or honeycomb) in Euclidean 6-space. It is constructed as an alternation of the regular 6-cube honeycomb.

It is composed of two different types of facets. The 6-cubes become alternated into 6-demicubes h{4,3,3,3,3} and the alternated vertices create 6-orthoplex {3,3,3,3,4} facets.

== D6 lattice ==
The vertex arrangement of the 6-demicubic honeycomb is the D_{6} lattice. The 60 vertices of the rectified 6-orthoplex vertex figure of the 6-demicubic honeycomb reflect the kissing number 60 of this lattice. The best known is 72, from the E_{6} lattice and the 2_{22} honeycomb.

The D^{+}_{6} lattice (also called D^{2}_{6}) can be constructed by the union of two D_{6} lattices. This packing is only a lattice for even dimensions. The kissing number is 2^{5}=32 (2^{n-1} for n<8, 240 for n=8, and 2n(n-1) for n>8).

∪

The D^{*}_{6} lattice (also called D^{4}_{6} and C^{2}_{6}) can be constructed by the union of all four 6-demicubic lattices: It is also the 6-dimensional body centered cubic, the union of two 6-cube honeycombs in dual positions.

∪ ∪ ∪ = ∪.

The kissing number of the D_{6}^{*} lattice is 12 (2n for n≥5). and its Voronoi tessellation is a trirectified 6-cubic honeycomb,, containing all birectified 6-orthoplex Voronoi cell,.

== Symmetry constructions ==
There are three uniform construction symmetries of this tessellation. Each symmetry can be represented by arrangements of different colors on the 64 6-demicube facets around each vertex.

Coxeter group	Schläfli symbol	Coxeter-Dynkin diagram	Vertex figure Symmetry	Facets/verf
${\tilde{B}}_6$ = [3^{1,1},3,3,3,4] = [1^{+},4,3,3,3,3,4]	h{4,3,3,3,3,4}	=	[3,3,3,4]	64: 6-demicube 12: 6-orthoplex
${\tilde{D}}_6$ = [3^{1,1},3,3^{1,1}] = [1^{+},4,3,3,3^{1,1}]	h{4,3,3,3,3^{1,1}}	=	[3^{3,1,1}]	32+32: 6-demicube 12: 6-orthoplex
½${\tilde{C}}_6$ = [[(4,3,3,3,4,2^{+})]]	ht_{0,6}{4,3,3,3,3,4}			32+16+16: 6-demicube 12: 6-orthoplex

== Related honeycombs ==
This honeycomb is one of 41 uniform honeycombs constructed by the ${\tilde{D}}_6$ Coxeter group, all but 6 repeated in other families by extended symmetry, seen in the graph symmetry of rings in the Coxeter–Dynkin diagrams. The 41 permutations are listed with its highest extended symmetry, and related ${\tilde{B}}_6$ and ${\tilde{C}}_6$ constructions:

D6 honeycombs
Extended symmetry	Extended diagram	Order	Honeycombs
[3^{1,1},3,3,3^{1,1}]		×1	,
[[3^{1,1},3,3,3^{1,1}]]		×2	,,,
<[3^{1,1},3,3,3^{1,1}]> ↔ [3^{1,1},3,3,3,4]	↔	×2	,,,,,,,,,,,,,,,
<2[3^{1,1},3,3,3^{1,1}]> ↔ [4,3,3,3,3,4]	↔	×4	,,,,,,,,,,,
[<2[3^{1,1},3,3,3^{1,1}]>] ↔ [[4,3,3,3,3,4]]	↔	×8	,,,,,,

== See also ==
- 6-cubic honeycomb

== Notes ==
Fundamental convex regular and uniform honeycombs in dimensions 2–9
Space	Family	${\tilde{A}}_{n-1}$	${\tilde{C}}_{n-1}$	${\tilde{B}}_{n-1}$	${\tilde{D}}_{n-1}$	${\tilde{G}}_2$ / ${\tilde{F}}_4$ / ${\tilde{E}}_{n-1}$
E^{2}	Uniform tiling	0_{[3]}	δ_{3}	hδ_{3}	qδ_{3}	Hexagonal
E^{3}	Uniform convex honeycomb	0_{[4]}	δ_{4}	hδ_{4}	qδ_{4}	
E^{4}	Uniform 4-honeycomb	0_{[5]}	δ_{5}	hδ_{5}	qδ_{5}	24-cell honeycomb
E^{5}	Uniform 5-honeycomb	0_{[6]}	δ_{6}	hδ_{6}	qδ_{6}	
E^{6}	Uniform 6-honeycomb	0_{[7]}	δ_{7}	hδ_{7}	qδ_{7}	2_{22}
E^{7}	Uniform 7-honeycomb	0_{[8]}	δ_{8}	hδ_{8}	qδ_{8}	1_{33} • 3_{31}
E^{8}	Uniform 8-honeycomb	0_{[9]}	δ_{9}	hδ_{9}	qδ_{9}	1_{52} • 2_{51} • 5_{21}
E^{9}	Uniform 9-honeycomb	0_{[10]}	δ_{10}	hδ_{10}	qδ_{10}	
E^{10}	Uniform 10-honeycomb	0_{[11]}	δ_{11}	hδ_{11}	qδ_{11}	
E^{n−1}	Uniform (n−1)-honeycomb	0_{[n]}	δ_{n}	hδ_{n}	qδ_{n}	1_{k2} • 2_{k1} • k_{21}
