= 5-cubic honeycomb =

Tiling of five-dimensional space

5-cubic honeycomb
(no image)
Type	Regular 5-space honeycomb Uniform 5-honeycomb
Family	Hypercube honeycomb
Schläfli symbol	{4,3^{3},4} t_{0,5}{4,3^{3},4} {4,3,3,3^{1,1}} {4,3,4}×{∞} {4,3,4}×{4,4} {4,3,4}×{∞}^{(2)} {4,4}^{(2)}×{∞} {∞}^{(5)}
Coxeter-Dynkin diagrams	
5-face type	{4,3^{3}} (5-cube)
4-face type	{4,3,3} (tesseract)
Cell type	{4,3} (cube)
Face type	{4} (square)
Face figure	{4,3} (octahedron)
Edge figure	8 {4,3,3} (16-cell)
Vertex figure	32 {4,3^{3}} (5-orthoplex)
Coxeter group	${\tilde{C}}_5$ [4,3^{3},4]
Dual	self-dual
Properties	vertex-transitive, edge-transitive, face-transitive, cell-transitive

In geometry, the 5-cubic honeycomb or penteractic honeycomb is the only regular space-filling tessellation (or honeycomb) in Euclidean 5-space. Four 5-cubes meet at each cubic cell, and it is more explicitly called an order-4 penteractic honeycomb.

It is analogous to the square tiling of the plane and to the cubic honeycomb of 3-space, and the tesseractic honeycomb of 4-space.

== Constructions ==
There are many different Wythoff constructions of this honeycomb. The most symmetric form is regular, with Schläfli symbol {4,3^{3},4}. Another form has two alternating 5-cube facets (like a checkerboard) with Schläfli symbol {4,3,3,3^{1,1}}. The lowest symmetry Wythoff construction has 32 types of facets around each vertex and a prismatic product Schläfli symbol {∞}^{(5)}.

== Related polytopes and honeycombs ==
The [4,3^{3},4],, Coxeter group generates 63 permutations of uniform tessellations, 35 with unique symmetry and 34 with unique geometry. The expanded 5-cubic honeycomb is geometrically identical to the 5-cubic honeycomb.

The 5-cubic honeycomb can be alternated into the 5-demicubic honeycomb, replacing the 5-cubes with 5-demicubes, and the alternated gaps are filled by 5-orthoplex facets.

It is also related to the regular 6-cube which exists in 6-space with three 5-cubes on each cell. This could be considered as a tessellation on the 5-sphere, an order-3 penteractic honeycomb, {4,3^{4}}.

The Penrose tilings are 2-dimensional aperiodic tilings that can be obtained as a projection of the 5-cubic honeycomb along a 5-fold rotational axis of symmetry. The vertices correspond to points in the 5-dimensional cubic lattice, and the tiles are formed by connecting points in a predefined manner.

=== Tritruncated 5-cubic honeycomb ===
A tritruncated 5-cubic honeycomb,, contains all bitruncated 5-orthoplex facets and is the Voronoi tessellation of the D_{5}^{*} lattice. Facets can be identically colored from a doubled ${\tilde{C}}_5$×2, [[4,3^{3},4] symmetry, alternately colored from ${\tilde{C}}_5$, [4,3^{3},4] symmetry, three colors from ${\tilde{B}}_5$, [4,3,3,3^{1,1}] symmetry, and 4 colors from ${\tilde{D}}_5$, [3^{1,1},3,3^{1,1}] symmetry.

== See also ==
- List of regular polytopes

Regular and uniform honeycombs in 5-space:

- 5-demicubic honeycomb
- 5-simplex honeycomb
- Truncated 5-simplex honeycomb
- Omnitruncated 5-simplex honeycomb

Fundamental convex regular and uniform honeycombs in dimensions 2–9
Space	Family	${\tilde{A}}_{n-1}$	${\tilde{C}}_{n-1}$	${\tilde{B}}_{n-1}$	${\tilde{D}}_{n-1}$	${\tilde{G}}_2$ / ${\tilde{F}}_4$ / ${\tilde{E}}_{n-1}$
E^{2}	Uniform tiling	0_{[3]}	δ_{3}	hδ_{3}	qδ_{3}	Hexagonal
E^{3}	Uniform convex honeycomb	0_{[4]}	δ_{4}	hδ_{4}	qδ_{4}	
E^{4}	Uniform 4-honeycomb	0_{[5]}	δ_{5}	hδ_{5}	qδ_{5}	24-cell honeycomb
E^{5}	Uniform 5-honeycomb	0_{[6]}	δ_{6}	hδ_{6}	qδ_{6}	
E^{6}	Uniform 6-honeycomb	0_{[7]}	δ_{7}	hδ_{7}	qδ_{7}	2_{22}
E^{7}	Uniform 7-honeycomb	0_{[8]}	δ_{8}	hδ_{8}	qδ_{8}	1_{33} • 3_{31}
E^{8}	Uniform 8-honeycomb	0_{[9]}	δ_{9}	hδ_{9}	qδ_{9}	1_{52} • 2_{51} • 5_{21}
E^{9}	Uniform 9-honeycomb	0_{[10]}	δ_{10}	hδ_{10}	qδ_{10}	
E^{10}	Uniform 10-honeycomb	0_{[11]}	δ_{11}	hδ_{11}	qδ_{11}	
E^{n−1}	Uniform (n−1)-honeycomb	0_{[n]}	δ_{n}	hδ_{n}	qδ_{n}	1_{k2} • 2_{k1} • k_{21}
