= Uniform honeycomb =

Isogonal honeycomb of uniform polytope facets

In geometry, a uniform honeycomb or uniform tessellation or infinite uniform polytope, is a vertex-transitive honeycomb made from uniform polytope facets. All of its vertices are identical and there is the same combination and arrangement of faces at each vertex. Its dimension can be clarified as n-honeycomb or an n-dimensional honeycomb.

An n-dimensional uniform honeycomb can be constructed on the surface of n-spheres, in n-dimensional Euclidean space, and n-dimensional hyperbolic space. A 2-dimensional uniform honeycomb is more often called a uniform tiling or uniform tessellation.

Nearly all uniform tessellations can be generated by a Wythoff construction, and represented by a Coxeter–Dynkin diagram. The terminology for the convex uniform polytopes used in uniform polyhedron, uniform 4-polytope, uniform 5-polytope, uniform 6-polytope, uniform tiling, and convex uniform honeycomb articles were coined by Norman Johnson.

Wythoffian tessellations can be defined by a vertex figure. For 2-dimensional tilings, they can be given by a vertex configuration listing the sequence of faces around every vertex. For example, 4.4.4.4 represents a regular tessellation, a square tiling, with 4 squares around each vertex. In general an n-dimensional uniform tessellation vertex figures are defined by an (n−1)-polytope with edges labeled with integers, representing the number of sides of the polygonal face at each edge radiating from the vertex.

== Examples of uniform honeycombs ==
2-dimensional tessellations
	Spherical	Euclidean	Hyperbolic	
	Main article: Uniform polyhedron	Main article: List of uniform tilings	Main article: Uniform tilings in hyperbolic plane	
Coxeter diagram				
Picture	Truncated icosidodecahedron	Truncated trihexagonal tiling	Truncated triheptagonal tiling (Poincaré disk model)	Truncated triapeirogonal tiling
Vertex figure				
3-dimensional honeycombs
	3-spherical	3-Euclidean	3-hyperbolic	
	Main article: Uniform polychoron	Main article: Convex uniform honeycomb	Main article: Uniform honeycombs in hyperbolic space and paracompact uniform honeycomb	
Coxeter diagram				
Picture	(Stereographic projection); 16-cell	cubic honeycomb	order-4 dodecahedral honeycomb (Beltrami–Klein model)	order-4 hexagonal tiling honeycomb (Poincaré disk model)
Vertex figure	(Octahedron)	(Octahedron)	(Octahedron)	(Octahedron)

== See also ==
- Uniform tiling
- List of uniform tilings
- Uniform tilings in hyperbolic plane
- Honeycomb (geometry)
- Wythoff construction
- Convex uniform honeycomb
- List of regular polytopes
