= Runcinated 16-cell honeycomb =

Runcinated 16-cell honeycomb
(No image)
Type	Uniform 4-honeycomb
Schläfli symbol	t03{3,3,4,3}
Coxeter-Dynkin diagrams	
4-face type	r{3,4,3} t03{4,3,3} r{3,4}x{} {3}x{3}
Cell type	r{3,4} {4,3} {3,3}
Face type	{3}, {4}
Vertex figure	
Coxeter groups	${\tilde{F}}_4$, [3,4,3,3]
Properties	Vertex transitive

In four-dimensional Euclidean geometry, the runcinated 16-cell honeycomb is a uniform space-filling honeycomb. It can be seen as a runcination of the regular 16-cell honeycomb, containing Rectified 24-cell, runcinated tesseract, cuboctahedral prism, and 3-3 duoprism cells.

== Alternate names ==
- Runcinated hexadecachoric tetracomb/honeycomb
- Small prismated demitesseractic tetracomb (spaht)
- Small disicositetrachoric tetracomb

== Related honeycombs ==
The [3,4,3,3],, Coxeter group generates 31 permutations of uniform tessellations, 28 are unique in this family and ten are shared in the [4,3,3,4] and [4,3,3^{1,1}] families. The alternation (13) is also repeated in other families.

F4 honeycombs
Extended symmetry	Extended diagram	Order	Honeycombs
[3,3,4,3]		×1	_{1}, _{3}, _{5}, _{6}, _{8}, _{9}, _{10}, _{11}, _{12}
[3,4,3,3]		×1	_{2}, _{4}, _{7}, _{13}, _{14}, _{15}, _{16}, _{17}, _{18}, _{19}, _{20}, _{21}, _{22} _{23}, _{24}, _{25}, _{26}, _{27}, _{28}, _{29}
[(3,3)[3,3,4,3^{*}]] =[(3,3)[3^{1,1,1,1}]] =[3,4,3,3]	= =	×4	_{(2)}, _{(4)}, _{(7)}, _{(13)}

== See also ==
Regular and uniform honeycombs in 4-space:

- Tesseractic honeycomb
- 16-cell honeycomb
- 24-cell honeycomb
- Rectified 24-cell honeycomb
- Snub 24-cell honeycomb
- 5-cell honeycomb
- Truncated 5-cell honeycomb
- Omnitruncated 5-cell honeycomb

Fundamental convex regular and uniform honeycombs in dimensions 2–9
Space	Family	${\tilde{A}}_{n-1}$	${\tilde{C}}_{n-1}$	${\tilde{B}}_{n-1}$	${\tilde{D}}_{n-1}$	${\tilde{G}}_2$ / ${\tilde{F}}_4$ / ${\tilde{E}}_{n-1}$
E^{2}	Uniform tiling	0_{[3]}	δ_{3}	hδ_{3}	qδ_{3}	Hexagonal
E^{3}	Uniform convex honeycomb	0_{[4]}	δ_{4}	hδ_{4}	qδ_{4}	
E^{4}	Uniform 4-honeycomb	0_{[5]}	δ_{5}	hδ_{5}	qδ_{5}	24-cell honeycomb
E^{5}	Uniform 5-honeycomb	0_{[6]}	δ_{6}	hδ_{6}	qδ_{6}	
E^{6}	Uniform 6-honeycomb	0_{[7]}	δ_{7}	hδ_{7}	qδ_{7}	2_{22}
E^{7}	Uniform 7-honeycomb	0_{[8]}	δ_{8}	hδ_{8}	qδ_{8}	1_{33} • 3_{31}
E^{8}	Uniform 8-honeycomb	0_{[9]}	δ_{9}	hδ_{9}	qδ_{9}	1_{52} • 2_{51} • 5_{21}
E^{9}	Uniform 9-honeycomb	0_{[10]}	δ_{10}	hδ_{10}	qδ_{10}	
E^{10}	Uniform 10-honeycomb	0_{[11]}	δ_{11}	hδ_{11}	qδ_{11}	
E^{n-1}	Uniform (n-1)-honeycomb	0_{[n]}	δ_{n}	hδ_{n}	qδ_{n}	1_{k2} • 2_{k1} • k_{21}
