= Bitruncated 24-cell honeycomb =

Bituncated 24-cell honeycomb
(No image)
| Type | Uniform 4-honeycomb |
| Schläfli symbol | 2t{3,4,3,3} |
| Coxeter-Dynkin diagrams | |
| 4-face type | t{4,3,3} 2t{3,4,3} |
| Cell type | t{4,3} {3,3} |
| Face type | {3}, {8} |
| Vertex figure | |
| Coxeter groups | ${\tilde{F}}_4$, [3,4,3,3] |
| Properties | Vertex transitive |

In four-dimensional Euclidean geometry, the bitruncated 24-cell honeycomb is a uniform space-filling honeycomb. It can be seen as a bitruncation of the regular 24-cell honeycomb, constructed by truncated tesseract and bitruncated 24-cell cells.

== Alternate names ==
- Bitruncated icositetrachoric tetracomb/honeycomb
- Small tetracontaoctachoric tetracomb (baticot)

== Related honeycombs ==
The [3,4,3,3],, Coxeter group generates 31 permutations of uniform tessellations, 28 are unique in this family and ten are shared in the [4,3,3,4] and [4,3,3^{1,1}] families. The alternation (13) is also repeated in other families.

F4 honeycombs
| Extended symmetry | Extended diagram | Order | Honeycombs |
|---|---|---|---|
| [3,3,4,3] | | ×1 | _{1}, _{3}, _{5}, _{6}, _{8}, _{9}, _{10}, _{11}, _{12} |
| [3,4,3,3] | | ×1 | _{2}, _{4}, _{7}, _{13}, _{14}, _{15}, _{16}, _{17}, _{18}, _{19}, _{20}, _{21}, _{22} _{23}, _{24}, _{25}, _{26}, _{27}, _{28}, _{29} |
| [(3,3)[3,3,4,3^{*}]] =[(3,3)[3^{1,1,1,1}]] =[3,4,3,3] | = = | ×4 | _{(2)}, _{(4)}, _{(7)}, _{(13)} |

== See also ==
Regular and uniform honeycombs in 4-space:

- Tesseractic honeycomb
- 16-cell honeycomb
- 24-cell honeycomb
- Rectified 24-cell honeycomb
- Snub 24-cell honeycomb
- 5-cell honeycomb
- Truncated 5-cell honeycomb
- Omnitruncated 5-cell honeycomb

Fundamental convex regular and uniform honeycombs in dimensions 2–9
| Space | Family | ${\tilde{A}}_{n-1}$ | ${\tilde{C}}_{n-1}$ | ${\tilde{B}}_{n-1}$ | ${\tilde{D}}_{n-1}$ | ${\tilde{G}}_2$ / ${\tilde{F}}_4$ / ${\tilde{E}}_{n-1}$ |
| E^{2} | Uniform tiling | 0_{[3]} | δ_{3} | hδ_{3} | qδ_{3} | Hexagonal |
| E^{3} | Uniform convex honeycomb | 0_{[4]} | δ_{4} | hδ_{4} | qδ_{4} | |
| E^{4} | Uniform 4-honeycomb | 0_{[5]} | δ_{5} | hδ_{5} | qδ_{5} | 24-cell honeycomb |
| E^{5} | Uniform 5-honeycomb | 0_{[6]} | δ_{6} | hδ_{6} | qδ_{6} | |
| E^{6} | Uniform 6-honeycomb | 0_{[7]} | δ_{7} | hδ_{7} | qδ_{7} | 2_{22} |
| E^{7} | Uniform 7-honeycomb | 0_{[8]} | δ_{8} | hδ_{8} | qδ_{8} | 1_{33} • 3_{31} |
| E^{8} | Uniform 8-honeycomb | 0_{[9]} | δ_{9} | hδ_{9} | qδ_{9} | 1_{52} • 2_{51} • 5_{21} |
| E^{9} | Uniform 9-honeycomb | 0_{[10]} | δ_{10} | hδ_{10} | qδ_{10} | |
| E^{10} | Uniform 10-honeycomb | 0_{[11]} | δ_{11} | hδ_{11} | qδ_{11} | |
| E^{n−1} | Uniform (n−1)-honeycomb | 0_{[n]} | δ_{n} | hδ_{n} | qδ_{n} | 1_{k2} • 2_{k1} • k_{21} |
