= Bitruncated 16-cell honeycomb =

Bitruncated 16-cell honeycomb
(No image)
Type	Uniform honeycomb
Schläfli symbol	t_{1,2}{3,3,4,3} h_{2,3}{4,3,3,4} 2t{3,3^{1,1,1}}
Coxeter-Dynkin diagram	= =
4-face type	Truncated 24-cell Bitruncated tesseract
Cell type	Cube; Truncated octahedron Truncated tetrahedron
Face type	{3}, {4}, {6}
Vertex figure	
Coxeter group	${\tilde{F}}_4$ = [3,3,4,3] ${\tilde{B}}_4$ = [4,3,3^{1,1}] ${\tilde{D}}_4$ = [3^{1,1,1,1}]
Dual	?
Properties	vertex-transitive

In four-dimensional Euclidean geometry, the bitruncated 16-cell honeycomb (or runcicantic tesseractic honeycomb) is a uniform space-filling tessellation (or honeycomb) in Euclidean 4-space.

== Symmetry constructions ==
There are 3 different symmetry constructions, all with 3-3 duopyramid vertex figures. The ${\tilde{B}}_4$ symmetry doubles on ${\tilde{D}}_4$ in three possible ways, while ${\tilde{F}}_4$ contains the highest symmetry.

Affine Coxeter group	${\tilde{F}}_4$ [3,3,4,3]	${\tilde{B}}_4$ [4,3,3^{1,1}]	${\tilde{D}}_4$ [3^{1,1,1,1}]
Coxeter diagram			
4-faces			

== See also ==
Regular and uniform honeycombs in 4-space:

- Tesseractic honeycomb
- 16-cell honeycomb
- 24-cell honeycomb
- Rectified 24-cell honeycomb
- Truncated 24-cell honeycomb
- Snub 24-cell honeycomb
- 5-cell honeycomb
- Truncated 5-cell honeycomb
- Omnitruncated 5-cell honeycomb

== Notes ==
Fundamental convex regular and uniform honeycombs in dimensions 2–9
Space	Family	${\tilde{A}}_{n-1}$	${\tilde{C}}_{n-1}$	${\tilde{B}}_{n-1}$	${\tilde{D}}_{n-1}$	${\tilde{G}}_2$ / ${\tilde{F}}_4$ / ${\tilde{E}}_{n-1}$
E^{2}	Uniform tiling	0_{[3]}	δ_{3}	hδ_{3}	qδ_{3}	Hexagonal
E^{3}	Uniform convex honeycomb	0_{[4]}	δ_{4}	hδ_{4}	qδ_{4}	
E^{4}	Uniform 4-honeycomb	0_{[5]}	δ_{5}	hδ_{5}	qδ_{5}	24-cell honeycomb
E^{5}	Uniform 5-honeycomb	0_{[6]}	δ_{6}	hδ_{6}	qδ_{6}	
E^{6}	Uniform 6-honeycomb	0_{[7]}	δ_{7}	hδ_{7}	qδ_{7}	2_{22}
E^{7}	Uniform 7-honeycomb	0_{[8]}	δ_{8}	hδ_{8}	qδ_{8}	1_{33} • 3_{31}
E^{8}	Uniform 8-honeycomb	0_{[9]}	δ_{9}	hδ_{9}	qδ_{9}	1_{52} • 2_{51} • 5_{21}
E^{9}	Uniform 9-honeycomb	0_{[10]}	δ_{10}	hδ_{10}	qδ_{10}	
E^{10}	Uniform 10-honeycomb	0_{[11]}	δ_{11}	hδ_{11}	qδ_{11}	
E^{n−1}	Uniform (n−1)-honeycomb	0_{[n]}	δ_{n}	hδ_{n}	qδ_{n}	1_{k2} • 2_{k1} • k_{21}
