= Tesseractic honeycomb =

Concept in euclidean geometry

Tesseractic honeycomb
Perspective projection of a 3x3x3x3 red-blue chessboard
Type	Regular 4-space honeycomb Uniform 4-honeycomb
Family	Hypercubic honeycomb
Schläfli symbols	{4,3,3,4} t_{0,4}{4,3,3,4} {4,3,3^{1,1}} {4,4}^{(2)} {4,3,4}×{∞} {4,4}×{∞}^{(2)} {∞}^{(4)}
Coxeter-Dynkin diagrams	
4-face type	{4,3,3}
Cell type	{4,3}
Face type	{4}
Edge figure	{3,4} (octahedron)
Vertex figure	{3,3,4} (16-cell)
Coxeter groups	${\tilde{C}}_4$, [4,3,3,4] ${\tilde{B}}_4$, [4,3,3^{1,1}]
Dual	self-dual
Properties	vertex-transitive, edge-transitive, face-transitive, cell-transitive, 4-face-transitive

In four-dimensional euclidean geometry, the tesseractic honeycomb is one of the three regular space-filling tessellations (or honeycombs), represented by Schläfli symbol {4,3,3,4}, and consisting of a packing of tesseracts (4-hypercubes).

Its vertex figure is a 16-cell. Two tesseracts meet at each cubic cell, four meet at each square face, eight meet on each edge, and sixteen meet at each vertex.

It is an analog of the square tiling, {4,4}, of the plane and the cubic honeycomb, {4,3,4}, of 3-space. These are all part of the hypercubic honeycomb family of tessellations of the form {4,3,...,3,4}. Tessellations in this family are self-dual.

== Coordinates ==
Vertices of this honeycomb can be positioned in 4-space in all integer coordinates (i,j,k,l).

== Sphere packing ==
Like all regular hypercubic honeycombs, the tesseractic honeycomb corresponds to a sphere packing of edge-length-diameter spheres centered on each vertex, or (dually) inscribed in each cell instead. In the hypercubic honeycomb of 4 dimensions, vertex-centered 3-spheres and cell-inscribed 3-spheres will both fit at once, forming the unique regular body-centered cubic lattice of equal-sized spheres (in any number of dimensions). Since the tesseract is radially equilateral, there is exactly enough space in the hole between the 16 vertex-centered 3-spheres for another edge-length-diameter 3-sphere. (This 4-dimensional body centered cubic lattice is actually the union of two tesseractic honeycombs, in dual positions.)

This is the same densest known regular 3-sphere packing, with kissing number 24, that is also seen in the other two regular tessellations of 4-space, the 16-cell honeycomb and the 24-cell-honeycomb. Each tesseract-inscribed 3-sphere kisses a surrounding shell of 24 3-spheres, 16 at the vertices of the tesseract and 8 inscribed in the adjacent tesseracts. These 24 kissing points are the vertices of a 24-cell of radius (and edge length) 1/2.

== Constructions ==
There are many different Wythoff constructions of this honeycomb. The most symmetric form is regular, with Schläfli symbol {4,3,3,4}. Another form has two alternating tesseract facets (like a checkerboard) with Schläfli symbol {4,3,3^{1,1}}. The lowest symmetry Wythoff construction has 16 types of facets around each vertex and a prismatic product Schläfli symbol {∞}^{4}. One can be made by stericating another.

== Related polytopes and tessellations ==
The [4,3,3,4],, Coxeter group generates 31 permutations of uniform tessellations, 21 with distinct symmetry and 20 with distinct geometry. The expanded tesseractic honeycomb (also known as the stericated tesseractic honeycomb) is geometrically identical to the tesseractic honeycomb. Three of the symmetric honeycombs are shared in the [3,4,3,3] family. Two alternations (13) and (17), and the quarter tesseractic (2) are repeated in other families.

C4 honeycombs
Extended symmetry	Extended diagram	Order	Honeycombs
[4,3,3,4]:		×1	_{1}, _{2}, _{3}, _{4}, _{5}, _{6}, _{7}, _{8}, _{9}, _{10}, _{11}, _{12}, _{13}
[[4,3,3,4]]		×2	_{(1)}, _{(2)}, _{(13)}, _{18} _{(6)}, _{19}, _{20}
[(3,3)[1^{+},4,3,3,4,1^{+}]] ↔ [(3,3)[3^{1,1,1,1}]] ↔ [3,4,3,3]	↔ ↔	×6	_{14}, _{15}, _{16}, _{17}

The [4,3,3^{1,1}],, Coxeter group generates 31 permutations of uniform tessellations, 23 with distinct symmetry and 4 with distinct geometry. There are two alternated forms: the alternations (19) and (24) have the same geometry as the 16-cell honeycomb and snub 24-cell honeycomb respectively.

B4 honeycombs
Extended symmetry	Extended diagram	Order	Honeycombs
[4,3,3^{1,1}]:		×1	_{5}, _{6}, _{7}, _{8}
<[4,3,3^{1,1}]>: ↔[4,3,3,4]	↔	×2	_{9}, _{10}, _{11}, _{12}, _{13}, _{14}, _{(10)}, _{15}, _{16}, _{(13)}, _{17}, _{18}, _{19}
[3[1^{+},4,3,3^{1,1}]] ↔ [3[3,3^{1,1,1}]] ↔ [3,3,4,3]	↔ ↔	×3	_{1}, _{2}, _{3}, _{4}
[(3,3)[1^{+},4,3,3^{1,1}]] ↔ [(3,3)[3^{1,1,1,1}]] ↔ [3,4,3,3]	↔ ↔	×12	_{20}, _{21}, _{22}, _{23}

The 24-cell honeycomb is similar, but in addition to the vertices at integers (i,j,k,l), it has vertices at half integers (i+1/2,j+1/2,k+1/2,l+1/2) of odd integers only. It is a half-filled body centered cubic (a checkerboard in which the red 4-cubes have a central vertex but the black 4-cubes do not).

The tesseract can make a regular tessellation of the 4-sphere, with three tesseracts per face, with Schläfli symbol {4,3,3,3}, called an order-3 tesseractic honeycomb. It is topologically equivalent to the regular polytope penteract in 5-space.

The tesseract can make a regular tessellation of 4-dimensional hyperbolic space, with 5 tesseracts around each face, with Schläfli symbol {4,3,3,5}, called an order-5 tesseractic honeycomb.

The Ammann–Beenker tiling is an aperiodic tiling in 2 dimensions obtained by cut-and-project on the tesseractic honeycomb along an eightfold rotational axis of symmetry.

=== Birectified tesseractic honeycomb ===
A birectified tesseractic honeycomb,, contains all rectified 16-cell (24-cell) facets and is the Voronoi tessellation of the D_{4}^{*} lattice. Facets can be identically colored from a doubled ${\tilde{C}}_4$×2, [[4,3,3,4]] symmetry, alternately colored from ${\tilde{C}}_4$, [4,3,3,4] symmetry, three colors from ${\tilde{B}}_4$, [4,3,3^{1,1}] symmetry, and 4 colors from ${\tilde{D}}_4$, [3^{1,1,1,1}] symmetry.

== See also ==
Regular and uniform honeycombs in 4-space:

- 16-cell honeycomb
- 24-cell honeycomb
- 5-cell honeycomb
- Truncated 5-cell honeycomb
- Omnitruncated 5-cell honeycomb

Fundamental convex regular and uniform honeycombs in dimensions 2–9
Space	Family	${\tilde{A}}_{n-1}$	${\tilde{C}}_{n-1}$	${\tilde{B}}_{n-1}$	${\tilde{D}}_{n-1}$	${\tilde{G}}_2$ / ${\tilde{F}}_4$ / ${\tilde{E}}_{n-1}$
E^{2}	Uniform tiling	0_{[3]}	δ_{3}	hδ_{3}	qδ_{3}	Hexagonal
E^{3}	Uniform convex honeycomb	0_{[4]}	δ_{4}	hδ_{4}	qδ_{4}	
E^{4}	Uniform 4-honeycomb	0_{[5]}	δ_{5}	hδ_{5}	qδ_{5}	24-cell honeycomb
E^{5}	Uniform 5-honeycomb	0_{[6]}	δ_{6}	hδ_{6}	qδ_{6}	
E^{6}	Uniform 6-honeycomb	0_{[7]}	δ_{7}	hδ_{7}	qδ_{7}	2_{22}
E^{7}	Uniform 7-honeycomb	0_{[8]}	δ_{8}	hδ_{8}	qδ_{8}	1_{33} • 3_{31}
E^{8}	Uniform 8-honeycomb	0_{[9]}	δ_{9}	hδ_{9}	qδ_{9}	1_{52} • 2_{51} • 5_{21}
E^{9}	Uniform 9-honeycomb	0_{[10]}	δ_{10}	hδ_{10}	qδ_{10}	
E^{10}	Uniform 10-honeycomb	0_{[11]}	δ_{11}	hδ_{11}	qδ_{11}	
E^{n−1}	Uniform (n−1)-honeycomb	0_{[n]}	δ_{n}	hδ_{n}	qδ_{n}	1_{k2} • 2_{k1} • k_{21}
