= Uniform tiling =

Vertex-transitive tiling of the plane by regular polygons

In geometry, a uniform tiling is a tessellation of the plane by regular polygon faces with the restriction of being vertex-transitive.

Uniform tilings can exist in both the Euclidean plane and hyperbolic plane. Uniform tilings are related to the finite uniform polyhedra; these can be considered uniform tilings of the sphere.

Most uniform tilings can be made from a Wythoff construction starting with a symmetry group and a singular generator point inside of the fundamental domain. A planar symmetry group has a polygonal fundamental domain and can be represented by its group notation: the sequence of the reflection orders of the fundamental domain vertices.

A fundamental domain triangle is denoted (p q r), where p, q, r are whole numbers > 1, i.e. ≥ 2; a fundamental domain right triangle is denoted (p q 2). The triangle may exist as a spherical triangle, a Euclidean plane triangle, or a hyperbolic plane triangle, depending on the values of p, q, and r.

There are several symbolic schemes for denoting these figures:

- The modified Schläfli symbol for a right triangle domain: (p q 2) → {p, q}.
- The Coxeter-Dynkin diagram is a triangular graph with p, q, r labeled on the edges. If r = 2, then the graph is linear, since diagram nodes with connectivity 2 are not connected to each other by a diagram branch (since domain mirrors meeting at 90 degrees generate no new mirrors).
- The Wythoff symbol takes the three integers and separates them by a vertical bar (|). If the generator point is off the mirror opposite to a domain vertex, then the reflection order of this domain vertex is given before the bar.
- Finally, a uniform tiling can be described by its vertex configuration: the (identical) sequence of polygons around each (equivalent) vertex.

All uniform tilings can be constructed from various operations applied to regular tilings. These operations, as named by Norman Johnson, are called truncation (cutting vertices), rectification (cutting vertices until edges disappear), and cantellation (cutting edges and vertices). Omnitruncation is an operation that combines truncation and cantellation. Snubbing is an operation of alternate truncation of the omnitruncated form. (See Uniform polyhedron#Wythoff construction operators for more details.)

== Coxeter groups ==
Coxeter groups for the plane define the Wythoff construction and can be represented by Coxeter-Dynkin diagrams:

For groups with integer reflection orders, including:

Euclidean plane
Orbifold symmetry	Coxeter group			Coxeter diagram	Notes
Compact
*333	(3 3 3)	${\tilde{A}}_2$	[3^{[3]}]		3 reflective forms, 1 snub
*442	(4 4 2)	${\tilde{B}}_2$	[4,4]		5 reflective forms, 1 snub
*632	(6 3 2)	${\tilde{G}}_2$	[6,3]		7 reflective forms, 1 snub
*2222	(∞ 2 ∞ 2)	${\tilde{I}}_1$ × ${\tilde{I}}_1$	[∞,2,∞]		3 reflective forms, 1 snub
Noncompact (Frieze)
*∞∞	(∞)	${\tilde{I}}_1$	[∞]		
*22∞	(2 2 ∞)	${\tilde{I}}_1$ × ${\tilde{A}}_2$	[∞,2]		2 reflective forms, 1 snub

Hyperbolic plane
Orbifold symmetry	Coxeter group		Coxeter diagram	Notes
Compact
*pq2	(p q 2)	[p,q]		2(p+q) < pq
*pqr	(p q r)	[(p,q,r)]		pq+pr+qr < pqr, i.e. 1/p + 1/q + 1/r < 1
Paracompact
*∞p2	(p ∞ 2)	[p,∞]		p ≥ 3
*∞pq	(p q ∞)	[(p,q,∞)]		p,q ≥ 3; p+q > 6
*∞∞p	(p ∞ ∞)	[(p,∞,∞)]		p ≥ 3
*∞∞∞	(∞ ∞ ∞)	[(∞,∞,∞)]		

== Uniform tilings of the Euclidean plane ==
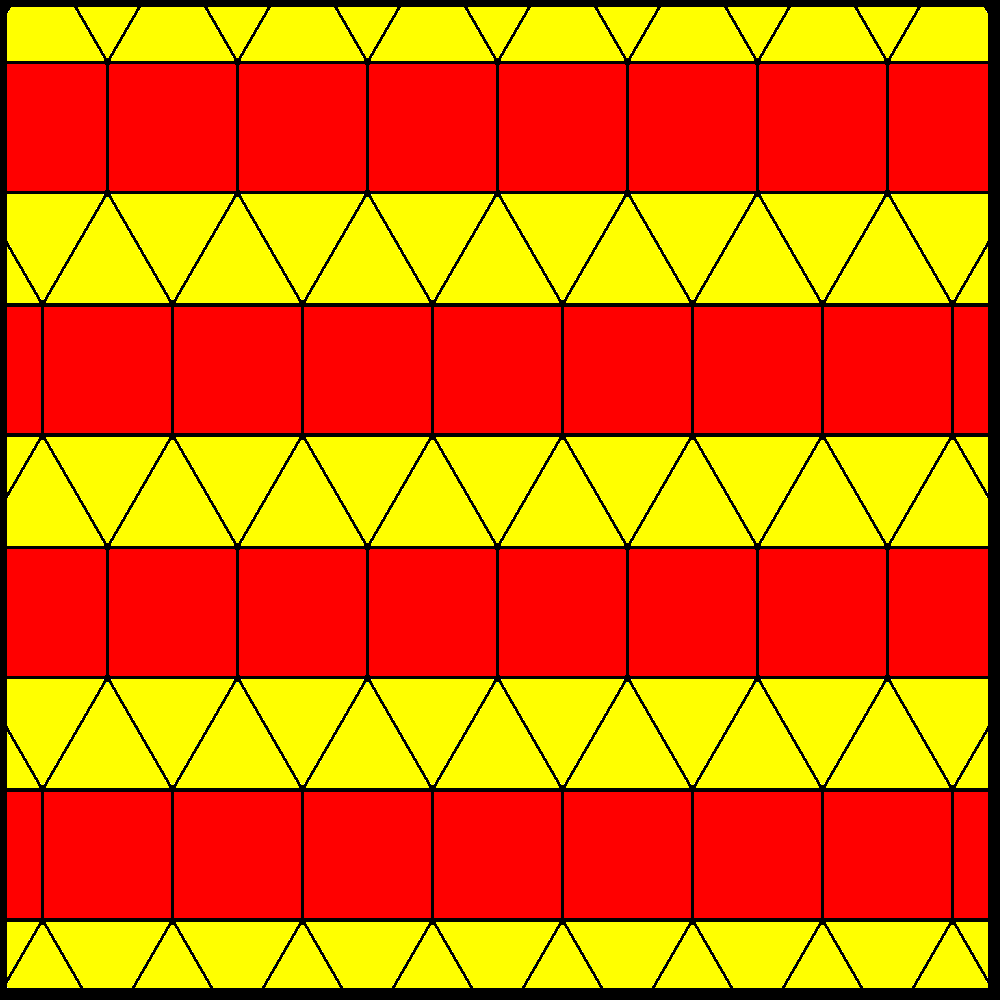
The elongated triangular tiling, the only non-Wythoffian convex uniform tiling

There are symmetry groups on the Euclidean plane constructed from fundamental triangles: (4 4 2), (6 3 2), and (3 3 3). Each is represented by a set of lines of reflection that divide the plane into fundamental triangles.

These symmetry groups create 3 regular tilings, and 7 semiregular ones. A number of the semiregular tilings are repeated from different symmetry constructors.

A prismatic symmetry group, (2 2 2 2), is represented by two sets of parallel mirrors, which in general can make a rectangular fundamental domain. It generates no new tilings.

A further prismatic symmetry group, (∞ 2 2), has an infinite fundamental domain. It constructs two uniform tilings: the apeirogonal prism and apeirogonal antiprism.

The stacking of the finite faces of these two prismatic tilings constructs one non-Wythoffian uniform tiling of the plane. It is called the elongated triangular tiling, composed of alternating layers of squares and triangles.

Right angle fundamental triangles: (p q 2)

(p q 2)	Fund. triangles	Parent	Truncated	Rectified	Bitruncated	Birectified (dual)	Cantellated	Omnitruncated (Cantitruncated)	Snub
Wythoff symbol		q | p 2	2 q | p	2 | p q	2 p | q	p | q 2	p q | 2	p q 2 |	| p q 2
Schläfli symbol		{p,q}	t{p,q}	r{p,q}	2t{p,q}=t{q,p}	2r{p,q}={q,p}	rr{p,q}	tr{p,q}	sr{p,q}
Coxeter diagram									
Vertex config.		p^{q}	q.2p.2p	(p.q)^{2}	p.2q.2q	q^{p}	p.4.q.4	4.2p.2q	3.3.p.3.q
Square tiling (4 4 2)		{4,4}	4.8.8	4.4.4.4	4.8.8	{4,4}	4.4.4.4	4.8.8	3.3.4.3.4
Hexagonal tiling (6 3 2)		{6,3}	3.12.12	3.6.3.6	6.6.6	{3,6}	3.4.6.4	4.6.12	3.3.3.3.6

General fundamental triangles: (p q r)

Wythoff symbol (p q r)	Fund. triangles	q | p r	r q | p	r | p q	r p | q	p | q r	p q | r	p q r |	| p q r
Coxeter diagram									
Vertex config.		(p.q)^{r}	r.2p.q.2p	(p.r)^{q}	q.2r.p.2r	(q.r)^{p}	q.2r.p.2r	r.2q.p.2q	3.r.3.q.3.p
Triangular (3 3 3)		(3.3)^{3}	3.6.3.6	(3.3)^{3}	3.6.3.6	(3.3)^{3}	3.6.3.6	6.6.6	3.3.3.3.3.3

Non-simplical fundamental domains

The only possible fundamental domain in Euclidean 2-space that is not a simplex is the rectangle (∞ 2 ∞ 2), with Coxeter diagram:. All forms generated from it become a square tiling.

== Uniform tilings of the hyperbolic plane ==
There are infinitely many uniform tilings by convex regular polygons on the hyperbolic plane, each based on a different reflective symmetry group (p q r).

A sampling is shown here with a Poincaré disk projection.

The Coxeter-Dynkin diagram is given in a linear form, although it is actually a triangle, with the trailing segment r connecting to the first node.

Further symmetry groups exist in the hyperbolic plane with quadrilateral fundamental domains — starting with (2 2 2 3), etc. — that can generate new forms. As well, there are fundamental domains that place vertices at infinity, such as (∞ 2 3), etc.

Right angle fundamental triangles: (p q 2)

(p q 2)	Fund. triangles	Parent	Truncated	Rectified	Bitruncated	Birectified (dual)	Cantellated	Omnitruncated (Cantitruncated)	Snub
Wythoff symbol		q | p 2	2 q | p	2 | p q	2 p | q	p | q 2	p q | 2	p q 2 |	| p q 2
Schläfli symbol		t{p,q}	t{p,q}	r{p,q}	2t{p,q}=t{q,p}	2r{p,q}={q,p}	rr{p,q}	tr{p,q}	sr{p,q}
Coxeter diagram									
Vertex config.		p^{q}	q.2p.2p	p.q.p.q	p.2q.2q	q^{p}	p.4.q.4	4.2p.2q	3.3.p.3.q
(5 4 2)	V4.8.10	{5,4}	4.10.10	4.5.4.5	5.8.8	{4,5}	4.4.5.4	4.8.10	3.3.4.3.5
(5 5 2)	V4.10.10	{5,5}	5.10.10	5.5.5.5	5.10.10	{5,5}	5.4.5.4	4.10.10	3.3.5.3.5
(7 3 2)	V4.6.14	{7,3}	3.14.14	3.7.3.7	7.6.6	{3,7}	3.4.7.4	4.6.14	3.3.3.3.7
(8 3 2)	V4.6.16	{8,3}	3.16.16	3.8.3.8	8.6.6	{3,8}	3.4.8.4	4.6.16	3.3.3.3.8

General fundamental triangles: (p q r)

Wythoff symbol (p q r)	Fund. triangles	q | p r	r q | p	r | p q	r p | q	p | q r	p q | r	p q r |	| p q r
Coxeter diagram									
Vertex config.		(p.r)^{q}	r.2p.q.2p	(p.q)^{r}	q.2r.p.2r	(q.r)^{p}	r.2q.p.2q	2p.2q.2r	3.r.3.q.3.p
(4 3 3)	V6.6.8	(3.4)^{3}	3.8.3.8	(3.4)^{3}	3.6.4.6	(3.3)^{4}	3.6.4.6	6.6.8	3.3.3.3.3.4
(4 4 3)	V6.8.8	(3.4)^{4}	3.8.4.8	(4.4)^{3}	3.6.4.6	(3.4)^{4}	4.6.4.6	6.8.8	3.3.3.4.3.4
(4 4 4)	V8.8.8	(4.4)^{4}	4.8.4.8	(4.4)^{4}	4.8.4.8	(4.4)^{4}	4.8.4.8	8.8.8	3.4.3.4.3.4

== Expanded lists of uniform tilings ==
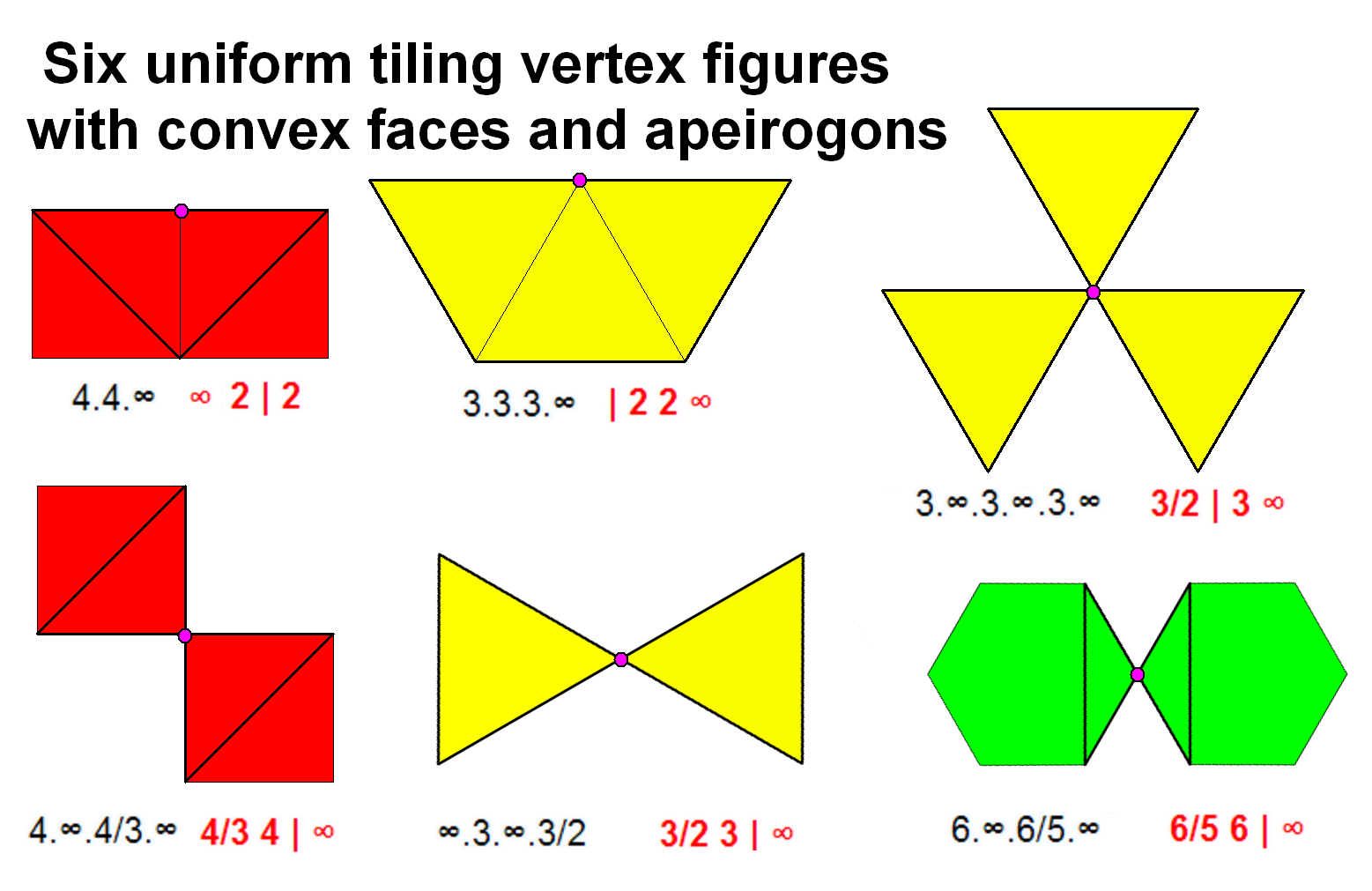
The vertex figures for the six tilings with convex regular polygon and apeirogon faces. (The Wythoff symbol is given in red.)

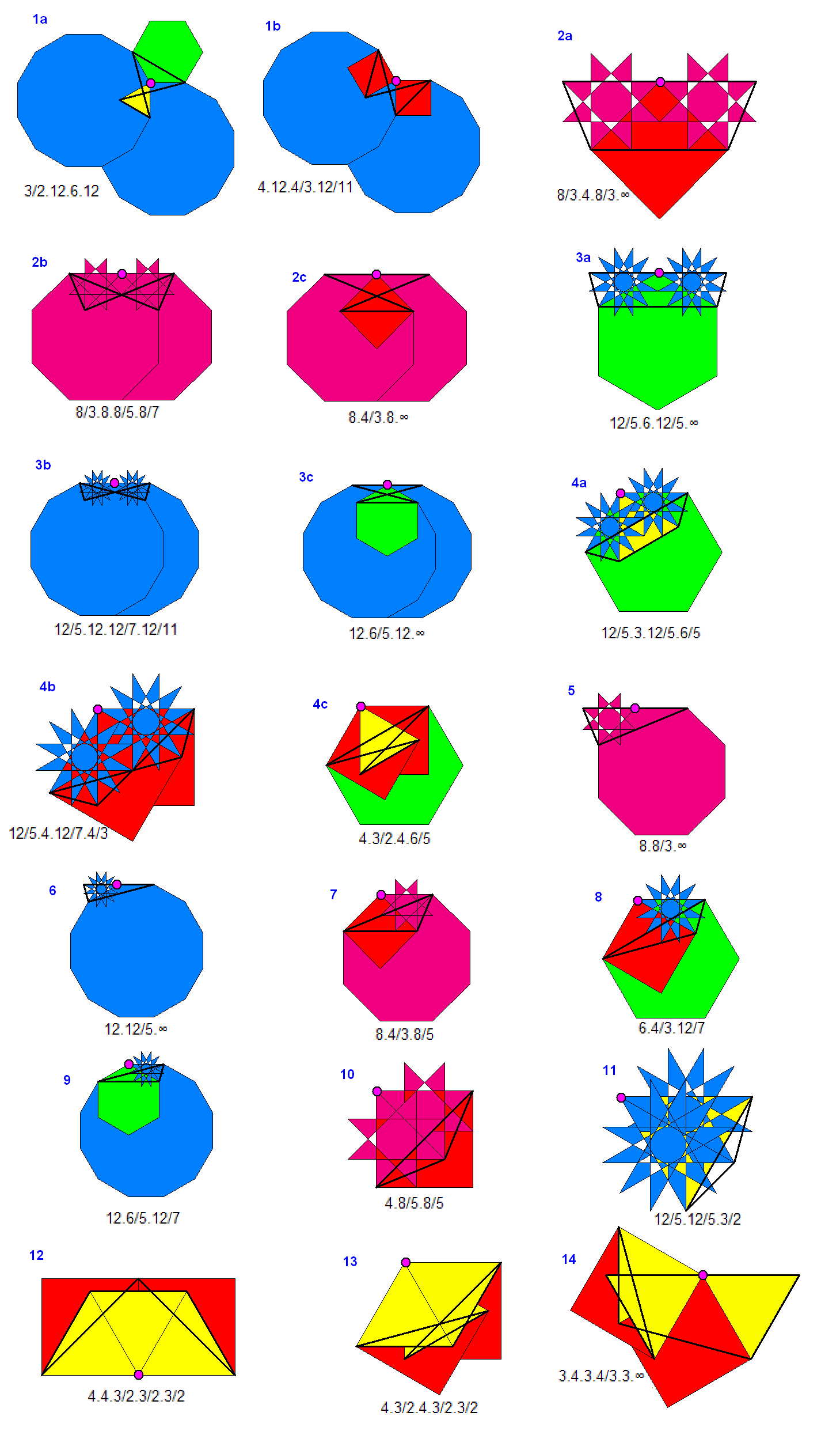
Vertex figures for 21 uniform tilings.

There are several ways the list of uniform tilings can be expanded:

1. Vertex figures can have retrograde faces and turn around the vertex more than once.
2. Star polygon tiles can be included.
3. Apeirogons, {∞}, can be used as tiling faces.
4. Zigzags (apeirogons alternating between two angles) can also be used.
5. The restriction that tiles meet edge-to-edge can be relaxed, allowing additional tilings such as the Pythagorean tiling.

Symmetry group triangles with retrogrades include:

(4/3 4/3 2), (6 3/2 2), (6/5 3 2), (6 6/5 3), (6 6 3/2).

Symmetry group triangles with infinity include:

(4 4/3 ∞), (3/2 3 ∞), (6 6/5 ∞).

Branko Grünbaum and G. C. Shephard, in the 1987 book Tilings and patterns, section 12.3, enumerate a list of 25 uniform tilings, including the 11 convex forms, and add 14 more they call hollow tilings, using the first two expansions above: star polygon faces and generalized vertex figures.

H. S. M. Coxeter, M. S. Longuet-Higgins, and J. C. P. Miller, in the 1954 paper 'Uniform polyhedra', Table 8: Uniform Tessellations, use the first three expansions and enumerate a total of 38 uniform tilings. If a tiling made of 2 apeirogons is also counted, the total can be considered 39 uniform tilings.

In 1981, Grünbaum, Miller, and Shephard, in their paper Uniform Tilings with Hollow Tiles, list 25 tilings using the first two expansions and 28 more when the third is added (making 53 using Coxeter et al.'s definition). When the fourth is added, they list an additional 23 uniform tilings and 10 families (8 depending on continuous parameters and 2 on discrete parameters).

Besides the 11 convex solutions, the 28 uniform star tilings listed by Coxeter et al., grouped by shared edge graphs, are shown below, followed by 15 more listed by Grünbaum et al. that meet Coxeter et al.'s definition but were missed by them.

This set is not proved complete. By "2.25" is meant tiling 25 in Grünbaum et al.'s table 2 from 1981.

The following three tilings are exceptional in that there is only finitely many of one face type: two apeirogons in each. Sometimes the order-2 apeirogonal tiling is not included, as its two faces meet at more than one edge.

Frieze group symmetry
McNeill	Diagram	Vertex Config.	Wythoff	Symmetry	Notes
I1		∞.∞		p1m1	(Two half-plane tiles, order-2 apeirogonal tiling)
I2		4.4.∞	∞ 2 | 2	p1m1	Apeirogonal prism
I3		3.3.3.∞	| 2 2 ∞	p11g	Apeirogonal antiprism

For clarity, the tilings are not colored from here onward (due to the overlaps). A set of polygons around one vertex is highlighted. McNeill only lists tilings given by Coxeter et al. (1954). The eleven convex uniform tilings have been repeated for reference.

Wallpaper group symmetry
McNeill	Grünbaum et al., 1981	Edge diagram	Highlighted	Vertex Config.	Wythoff	Symmetry
Convex	1.9			4.4.4.4	4 | 2 4	p4m
I4	2.14			4.∞.4/3.∞ 4.∞.−4.∞	4/3 4 | ∞	p4m
Convex	1.24			6.6.6	3 | 2 6	p6m
Convex	1.25			3.3.3.3.3.3	6 | 2 3	p6m
I5	2.26			(3.∞.3.∞.3.∞)/2	3/2 | 3 ∞	p3m1
Convex	1.23			3.6.3.6	2 | 3 6	p6m
I6	2.25			6.∞.6/5.∞ 6.∞.−6.∞	6/5 6 | ∞	p6m
I7	2.24			∞.3.∞.3/2; 3.∞.−3.∞	3/2 3 | ∞	p6m
Convex	1.14			3.4.6.4	3 6 | 2	p6m
1	1.15			3/2.12.6.12 −3.12.6.12	3/2 6 | 6	p6m
1	1.16			4.12.4/3.12/11; 4.12.−4.−12	2 6 (3/2 6/2) |	p6m
Convex	1.5			4.8.8	2 4 | 4	p4m
2	2.7			4.8/3.∞.8/3	4 ∞ | 4/3	p4m
2	1.7			8/3.8.8/5.8/7; 8.8/3.−8.−8/3	4/3 4 (4/2 ∞/2) |	p4m
2	2.6			8.4/3.8.∞ −4.8.∞.8	4/3 ∞ | 4	p4m
Convex	1.20			3.12.12	2 3 | 6	p6m
3	2.17			6.12/5.∞.12/5	6 ∞ | 6/5	p6m
3	1.21			12/5.12.12/7.12/11; 12.12/5.−12.−12/5	6/5 6 (6/2 ∞/2) |	p6m
3	2.16			12.6/5.12.∞ −6.12.∞.12	6/5 ∞ | 6	p6m
4	1.18			12/5.3.12/5.6/5; 3.12/5.−6.12/5	3 6 | 6/5	p6m
4	1.19			12/5.4.12/7.4/3; 4.12/5.−4.−12/5	2 6/5 (3/2 6/2) |	p6m
4	1.17			4.3/2.4.6/5; 3.−4.6.−4	3/2 6 | 2	p6m
5	2.5			8.8/3.∞	4/3 4 ∞ |	p4m
6	2.15			12.12/5.∞	6/5 6 ∞ |	p6m
7	1.6			8.4/3.8/5; 4.−8.8/3	2 4/3 4 |	p4m
Convex	1.11			4.6.12	2 3 6 |	p6m
8	1.13			6.4/3.12/7; 4.−6.12/5	2 3 6/5 |	p6m
9	1.12			12.6/5.12/7; 6.−12.12/5	3 6/5 6 |	p6m
10	1.8			4.8/5.8/5 −4.8/3.8/3	2 4 | 4/3	p4m
11	1.22			12/5.12/5.3/2 −3.12/5.12/5	2 3 | 6/5	p6m
Convex	1.1			3.3.3.4.4	non-Wythoffian	cmm
12	1.2			4.4.3/2.3/2.3/2; 3.3.3.−4.−4	non-Wythoffian	cmm
Convex	1.3			3.3.4.3.4	| 2 4 4	p4g
13	1.4			4.3/2.4.3/2.3/2; 3.3.−4.3.−4	| 2 4/3 4/3	p4g
14	2.4			3.4.3.4/3.3.∞ 3.4.3.−4.3.∞	| 4/3 4 ∞	p4
Convex	1.10			3.3.3.3.6	| 2 3 6	p6
	2.1			3/2.∞.3/2.∞.3/2.4/3.4/3; 3.4.4.3.∞.3.∞	non-Wythoffian	cmm
	2.2			3/2.∞.3/2.∞.3/2.4.4; 3.−4.−4.3.∞.3.∞	non-Wythoffian	cmm
	2.3			3/2.∞.3/2.4.4.3/2.4/3.4/3; 3.4.4.3.−4.−4.3.∞	non-Wythoffian	p3
	2.8			4.∞.4/3.8/3.8; 4.8.8/3.−4.∞	non-Wythoffian	p4m
	2.9			4.∞.4/3.8.8/3 −4.8.8/3.4.∞	non-Wythoffian	p4m
	2.10			4.∞.4/3.8.4/3.8; 4.8.−4.8.−4.∞	non-Wythoffian	p4m
	2.11			4.∞.4/3.8.4/3.8; 4.8.−4.8.−4.∞	non-Wythoffian	p4g
	2.12			4.∞.4/3.8/3.4.8/3; 4.8/3.4.8/3.−4.∞	non-Wythoffian	p4m
	2.13			4.∞.4/3.8/3.4.8/3; 4.8/3.4.8/3.−4.∞	non-Wythoffian	p4g
	2.18			3/2.∞.3/2.4/3.4/3.3/2.4/3.4/3; 3.4.4.3.4.4.3.∞	non-Wythoffian	p6m
	2.19			3/2.∞.3/2.4.4.3/2.4.4; 3.−4.−4.3.-4.−4.3.∞	non-Wythoffian	p6m
	2.20			3/2.∞.3/2.∞.3/2.12/11.6.12/11; 3.12.−6.12.3.∞.3.∞	non-Wythoffian	p6m
	2.21			3/2.∞.3/2.∞.3/2.12.6/5.12; 3.−12.6.−12.3.∞.3.∞	non-Wythoffian	p6m
	2.22			3/2.∞.3/2.∞.3/2.12/7.6/5.12/7; 3.12/5.6.12/5.3.∞.3.∞	non-Wythoffian	p6m
	2.23			3/2.∞.3/2.∞.3/2.12/5.6.12/5; 3.−12/5.−6.−12/5.3.∞.3.∞	non-Wythoffian	p6m

There are two uniform tilings for the vertex configuration 4.8.−4.8.−4.∞ (Grünbaum et al., 2.10 and 2.11) and also two uniform tilings for the vertex configuration 4.8/3.4.8/3.−4.∞ (Grünbaum et al., 2.12 and 2.13), with different symmetries. There is also a third tiling for each vertex configuration that is only pseudo-uniform (vertices come in two symmetry orbits). They use different sets of square faces. Hence, for star Euclidean tilings, the vertex configuration does not necessarily determine the tiling.

In the pictures below, the included squares with horizontal and vertical edges are marked with a central dot. A single square has edges highlighted.

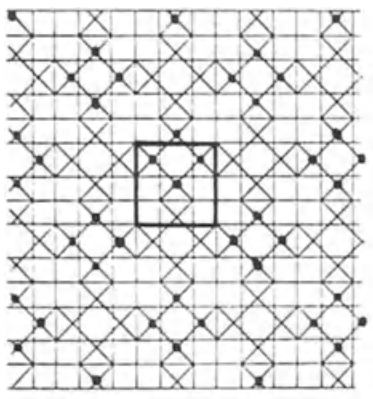
2.10 and 2.12 (p4m)

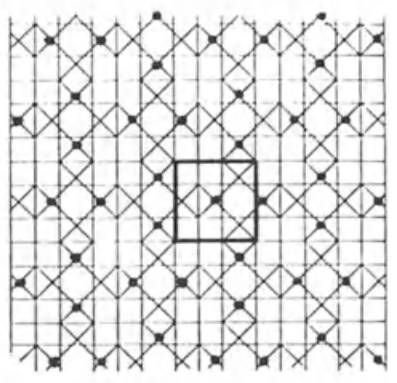
2.11 and 2.13 (p4g)

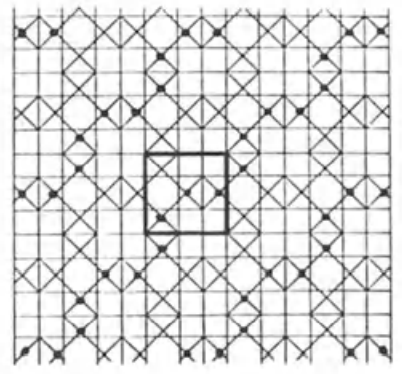
Pseudo-uniform

The tilings with zigzags are listed below. {∞^{𝛼}} denotes a zigzag with angle 0 < 𝛼 < π. The apeirogon can be considered the special case 𝛼 = π. The symmetries are given for the generic case, but there are sometimes special values of 𝛼 that increase the symmetry. Tilings 3.1 and 3.12 can even become regular; 3.32 already is (it has no free parameters). Sometimes, there are special values of 𝛼 that cause the tiling to degenerate.

Tilings with zigzags
Grünbaum et al., 1981	Diagram	Vertex Config.	Symmetry
3.1		∞^{𝛼}.∞^{β}.∞^{γ} 𝛼+β+γ=2π	p2
3.2		∞^{𝛼}.∞^{β}.−∞^{𝛼+β} 0<𝛼+β≤π	p2
3.3		3.3.∞^{π−𝛼}.−3.∞^{𝛼+2π/3} 0≤𝛼≤π/6	pgg
3.4		3.3.−∞^{π−𝛼}.−3.∞^{−𝛼+2π/3} 0≤𝛼<π/3	pgg
3.5		4.4.∞^{φ}.4.4.−∞^{φ} φ=2 arctan(n/k), nk even, (n,k)=1 drawn for φ=2 arctan 2	pmg
3.6		4.4.∞^{φ}.−4.−4.∞^{φ} φ=2 arctan(n/k), nk even, (n,k)=1 drawn for φ=2 arctan 1/2	pmg
3.7		3.4.4.3.−∞^{2π/3}.−3.−∞^{2π/3}	cmm
3.8		3.−4.−4.3.−∞^{2π/3}.−3.−∞^{2π/3}	cmm
3.9		4.4.∞^{π/3}.∞.−∞^{π/3}	p2
3.10		4.4.∞^{2π/3}.∞.−∞^{2π/3}	p2
3.11		∞.∞^{𝛼}.∞.∞^{−𝛼} 0<𝛼<π	cmm
3.12		∞^{𝛼}.∞^{π−𝛼}.∞^{𝛼}.∞^{π−𝛼} 0<𝛼≤π/2	cmm
3.13		3.∞^{𝛼}.−3.−∞^{𝛼} π/3<𝛼<π	p31m
3.14		4.4.∞^{2π/3}.4.4.−∞^{2π/3}	p31m
3.15		4.4.∞^{π/3}.−4.−4.−∞^{π/3}	p31m
3.16		4.∞^{𝛼}.−4.−∞^{𝛼} 0<𝛼<π, 𝛼≠π/2	p4g
3.17		4.−8.∞^{π/2}.∞.−∞^{π/2}.−8	cmm
3.18		4.−8.∞^{π/2}.∞.−∞^{π/2}.−8	p4
3.19		4.8/3.∞^{π/2}.∞.−∞^{π/2}.8/3	cmm
3.20		4.8/3.∞^{π/2}.∞.−∞^{π/2}.8/3	p4
3.21		6.−12.∞^{π/3}.∞.−∞^{π/3}.−12	p6
3.22		6.−12.∞^{2π/3}.∞.−∞^{2π/3}.−12	p6
3.23		6.12/5.∞^{π/3}.∞.−∞^{π/3}.12/5	p6
3.24		6.12/5.∞^{2π/3}.∞.−∞^{2π/3}.12/5	p6
3.25		3.3.3.∞^{2π/3}.−3.∞^{2π/3}	p31m
3.26		3.∞.3.−∞^{2π/3}.−3.−∞^{2π/3}	cm
3.27		3.∞.−∞^{2π/3}.∞.−∞^{2π/3}.∞	p31m
3.28		3.∞^{2π/3}.∞^{2π/3}.−3.−∞^{2π/3}.−∞^{2π/3}	p31m
3.29		∞.∞^{π/3}.∞^{π/3}.∞.−∞^{π/3}.−∞^{π/3}	cmm
3.30		∞.∞^{π/3}.−∞^{2π/3}.∞.∞^{2π/3}.−∞^{π/3}	p2
3.31		∞.∞^{2π/3}.∞^{2π/3}.∞.−∞^{2π/3}.−∞^{2π/3}	cmm
3.32		∞^{π/3}.∞^{π/3}.∞^{π/3}.∞^{π/3}.∞^{π/3}.∞^{π/3}	p6m
3.33		∞^{π/3}.−∞^{2π/3}.−∞^{2π/3}.∞^{π/3}.−∞^{2π/3}.−∞^{2π/3}	cmm

The tiling pairs 3.17 and 3.18, as well as 3.19 and 3.20, have identical vertex configurations but different symmetries.

Tilings 3.7 through 3.10 have the same edge arrangement as 2.1 and 2.2; 3.17 through 3.20 have the same edge arrangement as 2.10 through 2.13; 3.21 through 3.24 have the same edge arrangement as 2.18 through 2.23; and 3.25 through 3.33 have the same edge arrangement as 1.25 (the regular triangular tiling).

== Self-dual tilings ==
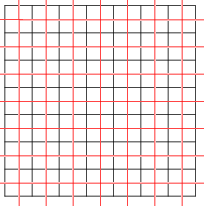
The {4,4} square tiling (black) with its dual (red).

A tiling can also be self-dual. The square tiling, with Schläfli symbol {4,4}, is self-dual; shown here are two square tilings (red and black), dual to each other.

== Uniform tilings using regular or isotoxal polygrams as nonconvex isotoxal simple polygons ==
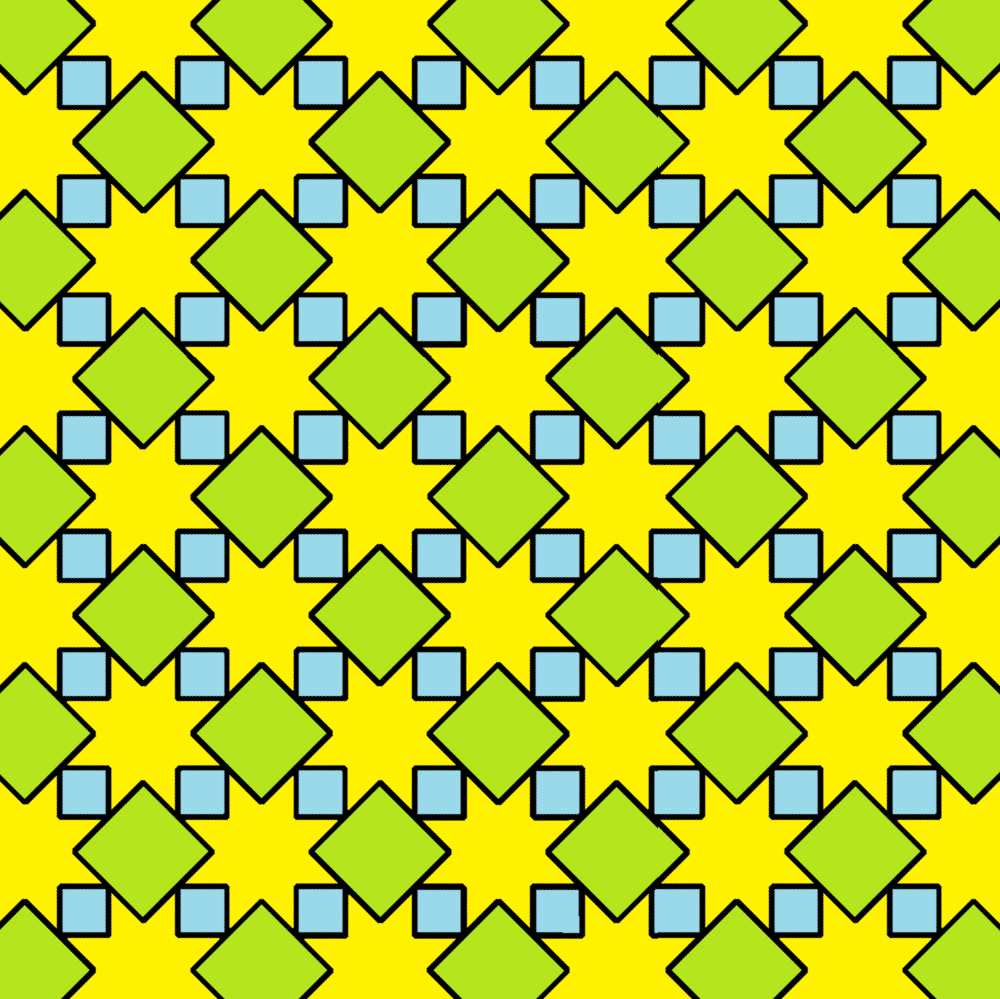
This example, 4.8^{*}_{π/4}.4^{**}_{π/2}.8^{*}_{π/4}, is considered not edge-to-edge due to the large square, although the latter can be interpreted as a star polygon with four pairs of collinear edges.

Seeing a regular star polygon as a nonconvex isotoxal simple polygon with twice as many (shorter) sides but alternating the same outer and "inner" internal angles allows regular star polygons to be used in a tiling, and seeing isotoxal simple polygons as "regular" allows regular star polygons to (but not all of them can) be used in a "uniform" tiling.

Also, the outlines of certain non-regular isotoxal star polygons are nonconvex isotoxal (simple) polygons with as many (shorter) sides and alternating the same outer and "inner" internal angles; seeing this kind of isotoxal star polygons as their outlines allows it to be used in a tiling, and seeing isotoxal simple polygons as "regular" allows this kind of isotoxal star polygons to (but not all of them can) be used in a "uniform" tiling.

An isotoxal simple 2n-gon with outer internal angle 𝛼 is denoted by {n_{𝛼}}; its outer vertices are labeled as n^{*}_{𝛼}, and inner ones as n^{**}_{𝛼}.

These expansions to the definition for a tiling require corners with only 2 polygons to not be considered vertices — since the vertex configuration for vertices with at least 3 polygons suffices to define such a "uniform" tiling, and so that the latter has one vertex configuration alright (otherwise it would have two) —. There are 4 such uniform tilings with adjustable angles 𝛼, and 18 such uniform tilings that only work with specific angles, yielding a total of 22 uniform tilings that use star polygons.

All of these tilings, with possible order-2 vertices ignored, with possible double edges and triple edges reduced to single edges, are topologically related to the ordinary uniform tilings (using only convex regular polygons).

4 "uniform" tilings using star polygons with adjustable angles 𝛼
3.6^{*}_{𝛼}.6^{**}_{𝛼} Topol. related to 3.12.12	4.4^{*}_{𝛼}.4^{**}_{𝛼} Topol. related to 4.8.8	6.3^{*}_{𝛼}.3^{**}_{𝛼} Topol. related to 6.6.6	3.3^{*}_{𝛼}.3.3^{**}_{𝛼} Topol. related to 3.6.3.6

18 "uniform" tilings using star polygons with specific angles
4.6.4^{*}_{π/6}.6 Topol. related to 4.4.4.4	(8.4^{*}_{π/4})^{2} Topol. related to 4.4.4.4	12.12.4^{*}_{π/3} Topol. related to 4.8.8	3.3.8^{*}_{π/12}.4^{**}_{π/3}.8^{*}_{π/12} Topol. related to 4.8.8	3.3.8^{*}_{π/12}.3.4.3.8^{*}_{π/12} Topol. related to 4.8.8	3.4.8.3.8^{*}_{π/12} Topol. related to 4.8.8
5.5.4^{*}_{π/10}.5.4^{*}_{π/10} Topol. related to 3.3.4.3.4	4.6^{*}_{π/6}.6^{**}_{π/2}.6^{*}_{π/6} Topol. related to 6.6.6	(4.6^{*}_{π/6})^{3} Topol. related to 6.6.6	9.9.6^{*}_{4π/9} Topol. related to 6.6.6	(6.6^{*}_{π/3})^{2} Topol. related to 3.6.3.6	(12.3^{*}_{π/6})^{2} Topol. related to 3.6.3.6
3.4.6.3.12^{*}_{π/6} Topol. related to 4.6.12	3.3.3.12^{*}_{π/6}.3.3.12^{*}_{π/6} Topol. related to 3.12.12	18.18.3^{*}_{2π/9} Topol. related to 3.12.12	3.6.6^{*}_{π/3}.6 Topol. related to 3.4.6.4	8.3^{*}_{π/12}.8.6^{*}_{5π/12} Topol. related to 3.4.6.4	9.3.9.3^{*}_{π/9} Topol. related to 3.6.3.6

== Uniform tilings using convex isotoxal simple polygons ==
Non-regular isotoxal either star or simple 2n-gons always alternate two angles. Isotoxal simple 2n-gons, {n_{𝛼}}, can be convex; the simplest ones are the rhombi (2×2-gons), {2_{𝛼}}. Considering these convex {n_{𝛼}} as "regular" polygons allows more tilings to be considered "uniform".

Examples of "uniform" tilings using convex isotoxal simple 2n-gons
3.2^{*}_{π/3}.6.2^{**}_{π/3} Topol. related to 3.4.6.4	4.4.4.4; Topol. related to 4.4.4.4	(2^{*}_{π/4}.2^{**}_{π/4})^{2} Topol. related to 4.4.4.4	2^{*}_{π/4}.2^{*}_{π/4}.2^{**}_{π/4}.2^{**}_{π/4} Topol. related to 4.4.4.4	4.2^{*}_{π/4}.4.2^{**}_{π/4} Topol. related to 4.4.4.4

== See also ==
- Wythoff symbol
- List of uniform tilings
- Uniform tilings in hyperbolic plane
- Uniform polytope

Fundamental convex regular and uniform honeycombs in dimensions 2–9
Space	Family	${\tilde{A}}_{n-1}$	${\tilde{C}}_{n-1}$	${\tilde{B}}_{n-1}$	${\tilde{D}}_{n-1}$	${\tilde{G}}_2$ / ${\tilde{F}}_4$ / ${\tilde{E}}_{n-1}$
E^{2}	Uniform tiling	0_{[3]}	δ_{3}	hδ_{3}	qδ_{3}	Hexagonal
E^{3}	Uniform convex honeycomb	0_{[4]}	δ_{4}	hδ_{4}	qδ_{4}	
E^{4}	Uniform 4-honeycomb	0_{[5]}	δ_{5}	hδ_{5}	qδ_{5}	24-cell honeycomb
E^{5}	Uniform 5-honeycomb	0_{[6]}	δ_{6}	hδ_{6}	qδ_{6}	
E^{6}	Uniform 6-honeycomb	0_{[7]}	δ_{7}	hδ_{7}	qδ_{7}	2_{22}
E^{7}	Uniform 7-honeycomb	0_{[8]}	δ_{8}	hδ_{8}	qδ_{8}	1_{33} • 3_{31}
E^{8}	Uniform 8-honeycomb	0_{[9]}	δ_{9}	hδ_{9}	qδ_{9}	1_{52} • 2_{51} • 5_{21}
E^{9}	Uniform 9-honeycomb	0_{[10]}	δ_{10}	hδ_{10}	qδ_{10}	
E^{10}	Uniform 10-honeycomb	0_{[11]}	δ_{11}	hδ_{11}	qδ_{11}	
E^{n−1}	Uniform (n−1)-honeycomb	0_{[n]}	δ_{n}	hδ_{n}	qδ_{n}	1_{k2} • 2_{k1} • k_{21}
