= 3 31 honeycomb =

3_{31} honeycomb
(no image)
Type	Uniform tessellation
Schläfli symbol	{3,3,3,3^{3,1}}
Coxeter symbol	3_{31}
Coxeter-Dynkin diagram	
7-face types	3_{21} {3^{6}}
6-face types	2_{21} {3^{5}}
5-face types	2_{11} {3^{4}}
4-face type	{3^{3}}
Cell type	{3^{2}}
Face type	{3}
Face figure	0_{31}
Edge figure	1_{31}
Vertex figure	2_{31}
Coxeter group	${\tilde{E}}_7$, [3^{3,3,1}]
Properties	vertex-transitive

In 7-dimensional geometry, the 3_{31} honeycomb is a uniform honeycomb, also given by Schläfli symbol {3,3,3,3^{3,1}} and is composed of 3_{21} and 7-simplex facets, with 56 and 576 of them respectively around each vertex.

== Construction ==
It is created by a Wythoff construction upon a set of 8 hyperplane mirrors in 7-dimensional space.

The facet information can be extracted from its Coxeter-Dynkin diagram.

Removing the node on the short branch leaves the 6-simplex facet:

Removing the node on the end of the 3-length branch leaves the 3_{21} facet:

The vertex figure is determined by removing the ringed node and ringing the neighboring node. This makes 2_{31} polytope.

The edge figure is determined by removing the ringed node and ringing the neighboring node. This makes 6-demicube (1_{31}).

The face figure is determined by removing the ringed node and ringing the neighboring node. This makes rectified 5-simplex (0_{31}).

The cell figure is determined by removing the ringed node of the face figure and ringing the neighboring nodes. This makes tetrahedral prism {}×{3,3}.

== Kissing number ==
Each vertex of this tessellation is the center of a 6-sphere in the densest known packing in 7 dimensions; its kissing number is 126, represented by the vertices of its vertex figure 2_{31}.

== E7 lattice ==
The 3_{31} honeycomb's vertex arrangement is called the E_{7} lattice.

${\tilde{E}}_7$ contains ${\tilde{A}}_7$ as a subgroup of index 144. Both ${\tilde{E}}_7$ and ${\tilde{A}}_7$ can be seen as affine extension from $A_7$ from different nodes:

The E_{7} lattice can also be expressed as a union of the vertices of two A_{7} lattices, also called A_{7}^{2}:

= ∪

The E_{7}^{*} lattice (also called E_{7}^{2}) has double the symmetry, represented by [[3,3^{3,3}]]. The Voronoi cell of the E_{7}^{*} lattice is the 1_{32} polytope, and voronoi tessellation the 1_{33} honeycomb. The E_{7}^{*} lattice is constructed by 2 copies of the E_{7} lattice vertices, one from each long branch of the Coxeter diagram, and can be constructed as the union of four A_{7}^{*} lattices, also called A_{7}^{4}:

∪ = ∪ ∪ ∪ = dual of.

== Related honeycombs ==
It is in a dimensional series of uniform polytopes and honeycombs, expressed by Coxeter as 3_{k1} series. A degenerate 4-dimensional case exists as 3-sphere tiling, a tetrahedral hosohedron.

3_{k1} dimensional figures
Space	Finite				Euclidean	Hyperbolic
n	4	5	6	7	8	9
Coxeter group	A_{3}A_{1}	A_{5}	D_{6}	E_{7}	${\tilde{E}}_{7}$=E_{7}^{+}	${\bar{T}}_8$=E_{7}^{++}
Coxeter diagram						
Symmetry	[3^{−1,3,1}]	[3^{0,3,1}]	[[3^{1,3,1}]] = [4,3,3,3,3]	[3^{2,3,1}]	[3^{3,3,1}]	[3^{4,3,1}]
Order	48	720	46,080	2,903,040	∞	
Graph					-	-
Name	3_{1,-1}	3_{10}	3_{11}	3_{21}	3_{31}	3_{41}

== See also ==
- 8-polytope
- 1_{33} honeycomb

Fundamental convex regular and uniform honeycombs in dimensions 2–9
Space	Family	${\tilde{A}}_{n-1}$	${\tilde{C}}_{n-1}$	${\tilde{B}}_{n-1}$	${\tilde{D}}_{n-1}$	${\tilde{G}}_2$ / ${\tilde{F}}_4$ / ${\tilde{E}}_{n-1}$
E^{2}	Uniform tiling	0_{[3]}	δ_{3}	hδ_{3}	qδ_{3}	Hexagonal
E^{3}	Uniform convex honeycomb	0_{[4]}	δ_{4}	hδ_{4}	qδ_{4}	
E^{4}	Uniform 4-honeycomb	0_{[5]}	δ_{5}	hδ_{5}	qδ_{5}	24-cell honeycomb
E^{5}	Uniform 5-honeycomb	0_{[6]}	δ_{6}	hδ_{6}	qδ_{6}	
E^{6}	Uniform 6-honeycomb	0_{[7]}	δ_{7}	hδ_{7}	qδ_{7}	2_{22}
E^{7}	Uniform 7-honeycomb	0_{[8]}	δ_{8}	hδ_{8}	qδ_{8}	1_{33} • 3_{31}
E^{8}	Uniform 8-honeycomb	0_{[9]}	δ_{9}	hδ_{9}	qδ_{9}	1_{52} • 2_{51} • 5_{21}
E^{9}	Uniform 9-honeycomb	0_{[10]}	δ_{10}	hδ_{10}	qδ_{10}	
E^{10}	Uniform 10-honeycomb	0_{[11]}	δ_{11}	hδ_{11}	qδ_{11}	
E^{n−1}	Uniform (n−1)-honeycomb	0_{[n]}	δ_{n}	hδ_{n}	qδ_{n}	1_{k2} • 2_{k1} • k_{21}
