= Uniform 1 k2 polytope =

Uniform polytope

In geometry, 1_{k2} polytope is a uniform polytope in n dimensions (n = k + 4) constructed from the E_{n} Coxeter group. The family was named by their Coxeter symbol 1_{k2} by its bifurcating Coxeter-Dynkin diagram, with a single ring on the end of the 1-node sequence. It can be named by an extended Schläfli symbol {3,3^{k,2}}.

== Family members ==
The family starts uniquely as 6-polytopes, but can be extended backwards to include the 5-demicube (demipenteract) in 5 dimensions, and the 4-simplex (5-cell) in 4 dimensions.

Each polytope is constructed from 1_{k−1,2} and (n−1)-demicube facets. Each has a vertex figure of a {3^{1,n−2,2}} polytope, is a birectified n-simplex, t_{2}{3^{n}}.

The sequence ends with k = 6 (n = 10), as an infinite tessellation of 9-dimensional hyperbolic space.

The complete family of 1_{k2} polytopes are:

1. 5-cell: 1_{02}, (5 tetrahedral cells)
2. 1_{12} polytope, (16 5-cell, and 10 16-cell facets)
3. 1_{22} polytope, (54 demipenteract facets)
4. 1_{32} polytope, (56 1_{22} and 126 demihexeract facets)
5. 1_{42} polytope, (240 1_{32} and 2160 demihepteract facets)
6. 1_{52} honeycomb, tessellates Euclidean 8-space (∞ 1_{42} and ∞ demiocteract facets)
7. 1_{62} honeycomb, tessellates hyperbolic 9-space (∞ 1_{52} and ∞ demienneract facets)

== Elements ==
Gosset 1_{k2} figures
n	1_{k2}	Petrie polygon projection	Name Coxeter-Dynkin diagram	Facets		Elements							
n	1_{k2}	Petrie polygon projection	Name Coxeter-Dynkin diagram	1_{k−1,2}	(n−1)-demicube	Vertices	Edges	Faces	Cells	4-faces	5-faces	6-faces	7-faces
4	1_{02}		1_{20}	--	5; 1_{10}	5	10	10	5				
5	1_{12}		1_{21}	16; 1_{20}	10; 1_{11}	16	80	160	120	26			
6	1_{22}		1_{22}	27; 1_{12}	27; 1_{21}	72	720	2160	2160	702	54		
7	1_{32}		1_{32}	56; 1_{22}	126; 1_{31}	576	10080	40320	50400	23688	4284	182	
8	1_{42}		1_{42}	240; 1_{32}	2160; 1_{41}	17280	483840	2419200	3628800	2298240	725760	106080	2400
9	1_{52}		1_{52} (8-space tessellation)	∞ 1_{42}	∞ 1_{51}	∞							
10	1_{62}		1_{62} (9-space hyperbolic tessellation)	∞ 1_{52}	∞ 1_{61}	∞							

== See also ==
- k_{21} polytope family
- 2_{k1} polytope family

Fundamental convex regular and uniform polytopes in dimensions 2–10
Family	A_{n}	B_{n}	I_{2}(p) / D_{n}	E_{6} / E_{7} / E_{8} / F_{4} / G_{2}	H_{n}
Regular polygon	Triangle	Square	p-gon	Hexagon	Pentagon
Uniform polyhedron	Tetrahedron	Octahedron • Cube	Demicube		Dodecahedron • Icosahedron
Uniform polychoron	Pentachoron	16-cell • Tesseract	Demitesseract	24-cell	120-cell • 600-cell
Uniform 5-polytope	5-simplex	5-orthoplex • 5-cube	5-demicube		
Uniform 6-polytope	6-simplex	6-orthoplex • 6-cube	6-demicube	1_{22} • 2_{21}	
Uniform 7-polytope	7-simplex	7-orthoplex • 7-cube	7-demicube	1_{32} • 2_{31} • 3_{21}	
Uniform 8-polytope	8-simplex	8-orthoplex • 8-cube	8-demicube	1_{42} • 2_{41} • 4_{21}	
Uniform 9-polytope	9-simplex	9-orthoplex • 9-cube	9-demicube		
Uniform 10-polytope	10-simplex	10-orthoplex • 10-cube	10-demicube		
Uniform n-polytope	n-simplex	n-orthoplex • n-cube	n-demicube	1_{k2} • 2_{k1} • k_{21}	n-pentagonal polytope
Topics: Polytope families • Regular polytope • List of regular polytopes and compounds • Polytope operations

Fundamental convex regular and uniform honeycombs in dimensions 2–9
Space	Family	${\tilde{A}}_{n-1}$	${\tilde{C}}_{n-1}$	${\tilde{B}}_{n-1}$	${\tilde{D}}_{n-1}$	${\tilde{G}}_2$ / ${\tilde{F}}_4$ / ${\tilde{E}}_{n-1}$
E^{2}	Uniform tiling	0_{[3]}	δ_{3}	hδ_{3}	qδ_{3}	Hexagonal
E^{3}	Uniform convex honeycomb	0_{[4]}	δ_{4}	hδ_{4}	qδ_{4}	
E^{4}	Uniform 4-honeycomb	0_{[5]}	δ_{5}	hδ_{5}	qδ_{5}	24-cell honeycomb
E^{5}	Uniform 5-honeycomb	0_{[6]}	δ_{6}	hδ_{6}	qδ_{6}	
E^{6}	Uniform 6-honeycomb	0_{[7]}	δ_{7}	hδ_{7}	qδ_{7}	2_{22}
E^{7}	Uniform 7-honeycomb	0_{[8]}	δ_{8}	hδ_{8}	qδ_{8}	1_{33} • 3_{31}
E^{8}	Uniform 8-honeycomb	0_{[9]}	δ_{9}	hδ_{9}	qδ_{9}	1_{52} • 2_{51} • 5_{21}
E^{9}	Uniform 9-honeycomb	0_{[10]}	δ_{10}	hδ_{10}	qδ_{10}	
E^{10}	Uniform 10-honeycomb	0_{[11]}	δ_{11}	hδ_{11}	qδ_{11}	
E^{n−1}	Uniform (n−1)-honeycomb	0_{[n]}	δ_{n}	hδ_{n}	qδ_{n}	1_{k2} • 2_{k1} • k_{21}
