= 2 22 honeycomb =

2_{22} honeycomb
(no image)
Type	Uniform tessellation
Coxeter symbol	2_{22}
Schläfli symbol	{3,3,3^{2,2}}
Coxeter diagram	
6-face type	2_{21}
5-face types	2_{11} {3^{4}}
4-face type	{3^{3}}
Cell type	{3,3}
Face type	{3}
Face figure	{3}×{3} duoprism
Edge figure	{3^{2,2}}
Vertex figure	1_{22}
Coxeter group	${\tilde{E}}_6$, [[3,3,3^{2,2}]]
Properties	vertex-transitive, facet-transitive

In geometry, the 2_{22} honeycomb is a uniform tessellation of the six-dimensional Euclidean space. It can be represented by the Schläfli symbol {3,3,3^{2,2}}. It is constructed from 2_{21} facets and has a 1_{22} vertex figure, with 54 2_{21} polytopes around every vertex.

Its vertex arrangement is the E_{6} lattice, and the root system of the E_{6} Lie group so it can also be called the E_{6} honeycomb.

== Construction ==
It is created by a Wythoff construction upon a set of 7 hyperplane mirrors in 6-dimensional space.

The facet information can be extracted from its Coxeter–Dynkin diagram,.

Removing a node on the end of one of the 2-node branches leaves the 2_{21}, its only facet type,

The vertex figure is determined by removing the ringed node and ringing the neighboring node. This makes 1_{22},.

The edge figure is the vertex figure of the vertex figure, here being a birectified 5-simplex, t_{2}{3^{4}},.

The face figure is the vertex figure of the edge figure, here being a triangular duoprism, {3}×{3},.

== Kissing number ==
Each vertex of this tessellation is the center of a 5-sphere in the densest known packing in 6 dimensions, with kissing number 72, represented by the vertices of its vertex figure 1_{22}.

== E_{6} lattice ==
The 2_{22} honeycomb's vertex arrangement is called the E_{6} lattice.

The E_{6}^{2} lattice, with [[3,3,3^{2,2}]] symmetry, can be constructed by the union of two E_{6} lattices:

∪

The E_{6}^{*} lattice (or E_{6}^{3}) with [[3,3^{2,2,2}]] symmetry. The Voronoi cell of the E_{6}^{*} lattice is the rectified 1_{22} polytope, and the Voronoi tessellation is a bitruncated 2_{22} honeycomb. It is constructed by 3 copies of the E_{6} lattice vertices, one from each of the three branches of the Coxeter diagram.

∪ ∪ = dual to.

== Geometric folding ==
The ${\tilde{E}}_6$ group is related to the ${\tilde{F}}_4$ by a geometric folding, so this honeycomb can be projected into the 4-dimensional 16-cell honeycomb.

${\tilde{E}}_6$	${\tilde{F}}_4$
{3,3,3^{2,2}}	{3,3,4,3}

== Related honeycombs ==
The 2_{22} honeycomb is one of 127 uniform honeycombs (39 unique) with ${\tilde{E}}_6$ symmetry. 24 of them have doubled symmetry [[3,3,3^{2,2}]] with 2 equally ringed branches, and 7 have sextupled (3!) symmetry [[3,3^{2,2,2}]] with identical rings on all 3 branches. There are no regular honeycombs in the family since its Coxeter diagram a nonlinear graph, but the 2_{22} and birectified 2_{22} are isotopic, with only one type of facet: 2_{21}, and rectified 1_{22} polytopes respectively.

Symmetry	Order	Honeycombs
[3^{2,2,2}]	Full	8:,,,,,,,.
[[3,3,3^{2,2}]]	×2	24:,,,,,,,,,,,,,,,,,,,,,,,.
[[3,3^{2,2,2}]]	×6	7:,,,,,,.

=== Birectified 2_{22} honeycomb ===
Birectified 2_{22} honeycomb
(no image)
Type	Uniform tessellation
Coxeter symbol	0_{222}
Schläfli symbol	{3^{2,2,2}}
Coxeter diagram	
6-face type	0_{221}
5-face types	0_{22} 0_{211}
4-face type	0_{21} 24-cell 0_{111}
Cell type	Tetrahedron 0_{20} Octahedron 0_{11}
Face type	Triangle 0_{10}
Vertex figure	Proprism {3}×{3}×{3}
Coxeter group	6×${\tilde{E}}_6$, [[3,3^{2,2,2}]]
Properties	vertex-transitive, facet-transitive

The birectified 2_{22} honeycomb, has rectified 1 22 polytope facets,, and a triangular proprism {3}×{3}×{3} vertex figure.

Its facets are centered on the vertex arrangement of E_{6}^{*} lattice, as:

∪ ∪

==== Construction ====
The facet information can be extracted from its Coxeter–Dynkin diagram,.

The vertex figure is determined by removing the ringed node and ringing the neighboring node. This makes a triangular proprism {3}×{3}×{3} (or triangular triprism),.

Removing a node on the end of one of the 3-node branches leaves the rectified 1_{22}, its only facet type,.

Removing a second end node defines 2 types of 5-faces: birectified 5-simplex, 0_{22} and birectified 5-orthoplex, 0_{211}.

Removing a third end node defines 2 types of 4-faces: rectified 5-cell, 0_{21}, and 24-cell, 0_{111}.

Removing a fourth end node defines 2 types of cells: octahedron, 0_{11}, and tetrahedron, 0_{20}.

=== k_{22} polytopes ===
The 2_{22} honeycomb, is fourth in a dimensional series of uniform polytopes, expressed by Coxeter as k_{22} series. The final is a paracompact hyperbolic honeycomb, 3_{22}. Each progressive uniform polytope is constructed from the previous as its vertex figure.

k_{22} figures in n dimensions
Space	Finite			Euclidean	Hyperbolic
n	4	5	6	7	8
Coxeter group	A_{2}A_{2}	A_{5}	E_{6}	${\tilde{E}}_{6}$=E_{6}^{+}	${\bar{T}}_7$=E_{6}^{++}
Coxeter diagram					
Symmetry	[[3^{2,2,-1}]]	[[3^{2,2,0}]]	[[3^{2,2,1}]]	[[3^{2,2,2}]]	[[3^{2,2,3}]]
Order	72	1440	103,680	∞	
Graph				∞	∞
Name	−1_{22}	0_{22}	1_{22}	2_{22}	3_{22}

The 2_{22} honeycomb is third in another dimensional series 2_{2k}.

2_{2k} figures of n dimensions
Space	Finite			Euclidean	Hyperbolic
n	4	5	6	7	8
Coxeter group	A_{2}A_{2}	A_{5}	E_{6}	${\tilde{E}}_{6}$=E_{6}^{+}	E_{6}^{++}
Coxeter diagram					
Graph				∞	∞
Name	2_{2,-1}	2_{20}	2_{21}	2_{22}	2_{23}

== Notes ==
Fundamental convex regular and uniform honeycombs in dimensions 2–9
Space	Family	${\tilde{A}}_{n-1}$	${\tilde{C}}_{n-1}$	${\tilde{B}}_{n-1}$	${\tilde{D}}_{n-1}$	${\tilde{G}}_2$ / ${\tilde{F}}_4$ / ${\tilde{E}}_{n-1}$
E^{2}	Uniform tiling	0_{[3]}	δ_{3}	hδ_{3}	qδ_{3}	Hexagonal
E^{3}	Uniform convex honeycomb	0_{[4]}	δ_{4}	hδ_{4}	qδ_{4}	
E^{4}	Uniform 4-honeycomb	0_{[5]}	δ_{5}	hδ_{5}	qδ_{5}	24-cell honeycomb
E^{5}	Uniform 5-honeycomb	0_{[6]}	δ_{6}	hδ_{6}	qδ_{6}	
E^{6}	Uniform 6-honeycomb	0_{[7]}	δ_{7}	hδ_{7}	qδ_{7}	2_{22}
E^{7}	Uniform 7-honeycomb	0_{[8]}	δ_{8}	hδ_{8}	qδ_{8}	1_{33} • 3_{31}
E^{8}	Uniform 8-honeycomb	0_{[9]}	δ_{9}	hδ_{9}	qδ_{9}	1_{52} • 2_{51} • 5_{21}
E^{9}	Uniform 9-honeycomb	0_{[10]}	δ_{10}	hδ_{10}	qδ_{10}	
E^{10}	Uniform 10-honeycomb	0_{[11]}	δ_{11}	hδ_{11}	qδ_{11}	
E^{n−1}	Uniform (n−1)-honeycomb	0_{[n]}	δ_{n}	hδ_{n}	qδ_{n}	1_{k2} • 2_{k1} • k_{21}
