= 5 21 honeycomb =

Type of uniform tessellation

5_{21} honeycomb
Type	Uniform honeycomb
Family	k_{21} polytope
Schläfli symbol	{3,3,3,3,3,3^{2,1}}
Coxeter symbol	5_{21}
Coxeter-Dynkin diagram	
8-faces	5_{11} {3^{7}}
7-faces	{3^{6}} Note that there are two distinct orbits of this 7-simplex under the honeycomb's full ${\tilde{E}}_8$ automorphism group.
6-faces	{3^{5}}
5-faces	{3^{4}}
4-faces	{3^{3}}
Cells	{3^{2}}
Faces	{3}
Cell figure	1_{21}
Face figure	2_{21}
Edge figure	3_{21}
Vertex figure	4_{21}
Symmetry group	${\tilde{E}}_8$, [3^{5,2,1}]

In geometry, the 5_{21} honeycomb is a uniform tessellation of 8-dimensional Euclidean space. The symbol 5_{21} is from Coxeter, named for the length of the 3 branches of its Coxeter-Dynkin diagram.

By putting spheres at its vertices one obtains the densest-possible packing of spheres in 8 dimensions. This was proven by Maryna Viazovska in 2016 using the theory of modular forms. Viazovska was awarded the Fields Medal for this work in 2022.

This honeycomb was first studied by Gosset who called it a 9-ic semi-regular figure (Gosset regarded honeycombs in n dimensions as degenerate n+1 polytopes).

Each vertex of the 5_{21} honeycomb is surrounded by 2160 8-orthoplexes and 17280 8-simplices.

The vertex figure of Gosset's honeycomb is the semiregular 4_{21} polytope. It is the final figure in the k_{21} family.

This honeycomb is highly regular in the sense that its symmetry group (the affine ${\tilde{E}}_8$ Weyl group) acts transitively on the k-faces for k ≤ 6. All of the k-faces for k ≤ 7 are simplices.

== Construction ==
It is created by a Wythoff construction upon a set of 9 hyperplane mirrors in 8-dimensional space.

The facet information can be extracted from its Coxeter-Dynkin diagram.

Removing the node on the end of the 2-length branch leaves the 8-orthoplex, 6_{11}.

Removing the node on the end of the 1-length branch leaves the 8-simplex.

The vertex figure is determined by removing the ringed node and ringing the neighboring node. This makes the 4_{21} polytope.

The edge figure is determined from the vertex figure by removing the ringed node and ringing the neighboring node. This makes the 3_{21} polytope.

The face figure is determined from the edge figure by removing the ringed node and ringing the neighboring node. This makes the 2_{21} polytope.

The cell figure is determined from the face figure by removing the ringed node and ringing the neighboring node. This makes the 1_{21} polytope.

== Kissing number ==
Each vertex of this tessellation is the center of a 7-sphere in the densest packing in 8 dimensions; its kissing number is 240, represented by the vertices of its vertex figure 4_{21}.

== E8 lattice ==
${\tilde{E}}_8$ contains ${\tilde{A}}_8$ as a subgroup of index 5760. Both ${\tilde{E}}_8$ and ${\tilde{A}}_8$ can be seen as affine extensions of $A_8$ from different nodes:

${\tilde{E}}_8$ contains ${\tilde{D}}_8$ as a subgroup of index 270. Both ${\tilde{E}}_8$ and ${\tilde{D}}_8$ can be seen as affine extensions of $D_8$ from different nodes:

The vertex arrangement of 5_{21} is called the E8 lattice.

The E8 lattice can also be constructed as a union of the vertices of two 8-demicube honeycombs (called a D_{8}^{2} or D_{8}^{+} lattice), as well as the union of the vertices of three 8-simplex honeycombs (called an A_{8}^{3} lattice):

= ∪ = ∪ ∪

== Regular complex honeycomb ==
Using a complex number coordinate system, it can also be constructed as a $\mathbb{C}^4$ regular complex polytope, given the symbol 3{3}3{3}3{3}3{3}3, and Coxeter diagram. Its elements are in relative proportion as 1 vertex, 80 3-edges, 270 _{3}{3}_{3} faces, 80 _{3}{3}_{3}{3}_{3} cells and 1 _{3}{3}_{3}{3}_{3}{3}_{3} Witting polytope cells.

== Related polytopes and honeycombs ==
The 5_{21} is seventh in a dimensional series of semiregular polytopes, identified in 1900 by Thorold Gosset. Each member of the sequence has the previous member as its vertex figure. All facets of these polytopes are regular polytopes, namely simplexes and orthoplexes.

k_{21} figures in n dimensions
Space	Finite						Euclidean	Hyperbolic
E_{n}	3	4	5	6	7	8	9	10
Coxeter group	E_{3}=A_{2}A_{1}	E_{4}=A_{4}	E_{5}=D_{5}	E_{6}	E_{7}	E_{8}	E_{9} = ${\tilde{E}}_{8}$ = E_{8}^{+}	E_{10} = ${\bar{T}}_8$ = E_{8}^{++}
Coxeter diagram								
Symmetry	[3^{−1,2,1}]	[3^{0,2,1}]	[3^{1,2,1}]	[3^{2,2,1}]	[3^{3,2,1}]	[3^{4,2,1}]	[3^{5,2,1}]	[3^{6,2,1}]
Order	12	120	1,920	51,840	2,903,040	696,729,600	∞	
Graph							-	-
Name	−1_{21}	0_{21}	1_{21}	2_{21}	3_{21}	4_{21}	5_{21}	6_{21}

== See also ==
- E8 lattice
- 1_{52} honeycomb
- 2_{51} honeycomb

== Notes ==
Fundamental convex regular and uniform honeycombs in dimensions 2–9
Space	Family	${\tilde{A}}_{n-1}$	${\tilde{C}}_{n-1}$	${\tilde{B}}_{n-1}$	${\tilde{D}}_{n-1}$	${\tilde{G}}_2$ / ${\tilde{F}}_4$ / ${\tilde{E}}_{n-1}$
E^{2}	Uniform tiling	0_{[3]}	δ_{3}	hδ_{3}	qδ_{3}	Hexagonal
E^{3}	Uniform convex honeycomb	0_{[4]}	δ_{4}	hδ_{4}	qδ_{4}	
E^{4}	Uniform 4-honeycomb	0_{[5]}	δ_{5}	hδ_{5}	qδ_{5}	24-cell honeycomb
E^{5}	Uniform 5-honeycomb	0_{[6]}	δ_{6}	hδ_{6}	qδ_{6}	
E^{6}	Uniform 6-honeycomb	0_{[7]}	δ_{7}	hδ_{7}	qδ_{7}	2_{22}
E^{7}	Uniform 7-honeycomb	0_{[8]}	δ_{8}	hδ_{8}	qδ_{8}	1_{33} • 3_{31}
E^{8}	Uniform 8-honeycomb	0_{[9]}	δ_{9}	hδ_{9}	qδ_{9}	1_{52} • 2_{51} • 5_{21}
E^{9}	Uniform 9-honeycomb	0_{[10]}	δ_{10}	hδ_{10}	qδ_{10}	
E^{10}	Uniform 10-honeycomb	0_{[11]}	δ_{11}	hδ_{11}	qδ_{11}	
E^{n−1}	Uniform (n−1)-honeycomb	0_{[n]}	δ_{n}	hδ_{n}	qδ_{n}	1_{k2} • 2_{k1} • k_{21}
