= 1 33 honeycomb =

1_{33} honeycomb
(no image)
Type	Uniform tessellation
Schläfli symbol	{3,3^{3,3}}
Coxeter symbol	1_{33}
Coxeter-Dynkin diagram	or
7-face type	1_{32}
6-face types	1_{22} 1_{31}
5-face types	1_{21} {3^{4}}
4-face type	1_{11} {3^{3}}
Cell type	1_{01}
Face type	{3}
Cell figure	Square
Face figure	Triangular duoprism
Edge figure	Tetrahedral duoprism
Vertex figure	Trirectified 7-simplex
Coxeter group	${\tilde{E}}_7$, [[3,3^{3,3}]]
Properties	vertex-transitive, facet-transitive

In 7-dimensional geometry, 1_{33} is a uniform honeycomb, also given by Schläfli symbol {3,3^{3,3}}, and is composed of 1_{32} facets. It is also named pentacontahexa-hecatonicosihexa-exic heptacomb and Jonathan Bowers gives it acronym linoh

== Construction ==
It is created by a Wythoff construction upon a set of 8 hyperplane mirrors in 7-dimensional space.

The facet information can be extracted from its Coxeter-Dynkin diagram.

Removing a node on the end of one of the 3-length branch leaves the 1_{32}, its only facet type.

The vertex figure is determined by removing the ringed node and ringing the neighboring node. This makes the trirectified 7-simplex, 0_{33}.

The edge figure is determined by removing the ringed nodes of the vertex figure and ringing the neighboring node. This makes the tetrahedral duoprism, {3,3}×{3,3}.

== Kissing number ==
Each vertex of this polytope corresponds to the center of a 6-sphere in a moderately dense sphere packing, in which each sphere is tangent to 70 others; the best known for 7 dimensions (the kissing number) is 126.

== Geometric folding ==
The ${\tilde{E}}_7$ group is related to the ${\tilde{F}}_4$ by a geometric folding, so this honeycomb can be projected into the 4-dimensional demitesseractic honeycomb.

${\tilde{E}}_7$	${\tilde{F}}_4$
{3,3^{3,3}}	{3,3,4,3}

== E_{7}^{*} lattice ==
${\tilde{E}}_7$ contains ${\tilde{A}}_7$ as a subgroup of index 144. Both ${\tilde{E}}_7$ and ${\tilde{A}}_7$ can be seen as affine extension from $A_7$ from different nodes:

The E_{7}^{*} lattice (also called E_{7}^{2}) has double the symmetry, represented by [[3,3^{3,3}]]. The Voronoi cell of the E_{7}^{*} lattice is the 1_{32} polytope, and voronoi tessellation the 1_{33} honeycomb. The E_{7}^{*} lattice is constructed by 2 copies of the E_{7} lattice vertices, one from each long branch of the Coxeter diagram, and can be constructed as the union of four A_{7}^{*} lattices, also called A_{7}^{4}:

∪ = ∪ ∪ ∪ = dual of.

=== Related polytopes and honeycombs ===
The 1_{33} is fourth in a dimensional series of uniform polytopes and honeycombs, expressed by Coxeter as 1_{3k} series. The final is a noncompact hyperbolic honeycomb, 1_{34}.

1_{3k} dimensional figures
Space	Finite				Euclidean	Hyperbolic
n	4	5	6	7	8	9
Coxeter group	A_{3}A_{1}	A_{5}	D_{6}	E_{7}	${\tilde{E}}_{7}$=E_{7}^{+}	${\bar{T}}_8$=E_{7}^{++}
Coxeter diagram						
Symmetry	[3^{−1,3,1}]	[3^{0,3,1}]	[3^{1,3,1}]	[3^{2,3,1}]	[[3^{3,3,1}]]	[3^{4,3,1}]
Order	48	720	23,040	2,903,040	∞	
Graph					-	-
Name	1_{3,-1}	1_{30}	1_{31}	1_{32}	1_{33}	1_{34}

==== Rectified 1_{33} honeycomb ====
Rectified 1_{33} honeycomb
(no image)
Type	Uniform tessellation
Schläfli symbol	{3^{3,3,1}}
Coxeter symbol	0_{331}
Coxeter-Dynkin diagram	or
7-face type	Trirectified 7-simplex Rectified 1_{32}
6-face types	Birectified 6-simplex Birectified 6-cube Rectified 1_{22}
5-face types	Rectified 5-simplex Birectified 5-simplex Birectified 5-orthoplex
4-face type	5-cell Rectified 5-cell 24-cell
Cell type	{3,3} {3,4}
Face type	{3}
Vertex figure	{}×{3,3}×{3,3}
Coxeter group	${\tilde{E}}_7$, [[3,3^{3,3}]]
Properties	vertex-transitive, facet-transitive

The rectified 1_{33} or 0_{331}, Coxeter diagram has facets and, and vertex figure.

==== Alternative names ====
- Pentacontahexa-hecatonicosihexa-pentacosiheptacontahexa-exic heptacomb
- Rectified pentacontahexa-hecatonicosihexa-exic heptacomb
- Acronym: lanquoh (Jonathan Bowers)

== See also ==
- 8-polytope
- 3_{31} honeycomb

== Notes ==
Fundamental convex regular and uniform honeycombs in dimensions 2–9
Space	Family	${\tilde{A}}_{n-1}$	${\tilde{C}}_{n-1}$	${\tilde{B}}_{n-1}$	${\tilde{D}}_{n-1}$	${\tilde{G}}_2$ / ${\tilde{F}}_4$ / ${\tilde{E}}_{n-1}$
E^{2}	Uniform tiling	0_{[3]}	δ_{3}	hδ_{3}	qδ_{3}	Hexagonal
E^{3}	Uniform convex honeycomb	0_{[4]}	δ_{4}	hδ_{4}	qδ_{4}	
E^{4}	Uniform 4-honeycomb	0_{[5]}	δ_{5}	hδ_{5}	qδ_{5}	24-cell honeycomb
E^{5}	Uniform 5-honeycomb	0_{[6]}	δ_{6}	hδ_{6}	qδ_{6}	
E^{6}	Uniform 6-honeycomb	0_{[7]}	δ_{7}	hδ_{7}	qδ_{7}	2_{22}
E^{7}	Uniform 7-honeycomb	0_{[8]}	δ_{8}	hδ_{8}	qδ_{8}	1_{33} • 3_{31}
E^{8}	Uniform 8-honeycomb	0_{[9]}	δ_{9}	hδ_{9}	qδ_{9}	1_{52} • 2_{51} • 5_{21}
E^{9}	Uniform 9-honeycomb	0_{[10]}	δ_{10}	hδ_{10}	qδ_{10}	
E^{10}	Uniform 10-honeycomb	0_{[11]}	δ_{11}	hδ_{11}	qδ_{11}	
E^{n−1}	Uniform (n−1)-honeycomb	0_{[n]}	δ_{n}	hδ_{n}	qδ_{n}	1_{k2} • 2_{k1} • k_{21}
