= 5-cell honeycomb =

Geometric figure

4-simplex honeycomb
(No image)
Type	Uniform 4-honeycomb
Family	Simplectic honeycomb
Schläfli symbol	{3^{[5]}} = 0_{[5]}
Coxeter diagram	
4-face types	{3,3,3} t_{1}{3,3,3}
Cell types	{3,3} t_{1}{3,3}
Face types	{3}
Vertex figure	t_{0,3}{3,3,3}
Symmetry	${\tilde{A}}_4$×2 [3^{[5]}]
Properties	vertex-transitive

In four-dimensional Euclidean geometry, the 4-simplex honeycomb, 5-cell honeycomb or pentachoric-dispentachoric honeycomb is a space-filling tessellation honeycomb. It is composed of 5-cells and rectified 5-cells facets in a ratio of 1:1.

== Structure ==
Cells of the vertex figure are ten tetrahedrons and 20 triangular prisms, corresponding to the ten 5-cells and 20 rectified 5-cells that meet at each vertex. All the vertices lie in parallel realms in which they form alternated cubic honeycombs, the tetrahedra being either tops of the rectified 5-cell or the bases of the 5-cell, and the octahedra being the bottoms of the rectified 5-cell.

== Alternate names ==
- Cyclopentachoric tetracomb
- Pentachoric-dispentachoric tetracomb

== Projection by folding ==
The 5-cell honeycomb can be projected into the 2-dimensional square tiling by a geometric folding operation that maps two pairs of mirrors into each other, sharing the same vertex arrangement:

${\tilde{A}}_3$
${\tilde{C}}_2$

Two different aperiodic tilings with 5-fold symmetry can be obtained by projecting two-dimensional slices of the honeycomb: the Penrose tiling composed of rhombi, and the Tübingen triangle tiling composed of isosceles triangles.

== A4 lattice ==
The vertex arrangement of the 5-cell honeycomb is called the A4 lattice, or 4-simplex lattice. The 20 vertices of its vertex figure, the runcinated 5-cell represent the 20 roots of the ${\tilde{A}}_4$ Coxeter group. It is the 4-dimensional case of a simplectic honeycomb.

The A^{*}_{4} lattice is the union of five A_{4} lattices, and is the dual to the omnitruncated 5-simplex honeycomb, and therefore the Voronoi cell of this lattice is an omnitruncated 5-cell

∪ ∪ ∪ ∪ = dual of

== Related polytopes and honeycombs ==
The tops of the 5-cells in this honeycomb adjoin the bases of the 5-cells, and vice versa, in adjacent laminae (or layers); but alternating laminae may be inverted so that the tops of the rectified 5-cells adjoin the tops of the rectified 5-cells and the bases of the 5-cells adjoin the bases of other 5-cells. This inversion results in another non-Wythoffian uniform convex honeycomb. Octahedral prisms and tetrahedral prisms may be inserted in between alternated laminae as well, resulting in two more non-Wythoffian elongated uniform honeycombs.

This honeycomb is one of seven unique uniform honeycombs constructed by the ${\tilde{A}}_4$ Coxeter group. The symmetry can be multiplied by the symmetry of rings in the Coxeter–Dynkin diagrams:

A4 honeycombs
Pentagon symmetry	Extended symmetry	Extended diagram	Extended group	Honeycomb diagrams
a1	[3^{[5]}]		${\tilde{A}}_4$	(None)
i2	[[3^{[5]}]]		${\tilde{A}}_4$×2	_{1}, _{2}, _{3}, _{4}, _{5}, _{6}
r10	[5[3^{[5]}]]		${\tilde{A}}_4$×10	_{7}

=== Rectified 5-cell honeycomb ===
Rectified 5-cell honeycomb
(No image)
Type	Uniform 4-honeycomb
Schläfli symbol	t_{0,2}{3^{[5]}} or r{3^{[5]}}
Coxeter diagram	
4-face types	t_{1}{3^{3}} t_{0,2}{3^{3}} t_{0,3}{3^{3}}
Cell types	Tetrahedron; Octahedron; Cuboctahedron; Triangular prism
Vertex figure	triangular elongated-antiprismatic prism
Symmetry	${\tilde{A}}_4$×2 [3^{[5]}]
Properties	vertex-transitive

The rectified 4-simplex honeycomb or rectified 5-cell honeycomb is a space-filling tessellation honeycomb.

==== Alternate names ====
- small cyclorhombated pentachoric tetracomb
- small prismatodispentachoric tetracomb

=== Cyclotruncated 5-cell honeycomb ===
Cyclotruncated 5-cell honeycomb
(No image)
Type	Uniform 4-honeycomb
Family	Truncated simplectic honeycomb
Schläfli symbol	t_{0,1}{3^{[5]}}
Coxeter diagram	
4-face types	{3,3,3} t{3,3,3} 2t{3,3,3}
Cell types	{3,3} t{3,3}
Face types	Triangle {3} Hexagon {6}
Vertex figure	Tetrahedral antiprism [3,4,2^{+}], order 48
Symmetry	${\tilde{A}}_4$×2 [3^{[5]}]
Properties	vertex-transitive

The cyclotruncated 4-simplex honeycomb or cyclotruncated 5-cell honeycomb is a space-filling tessellation honeycomb. It can also be seen as a birectified 5-cell honeycomb.

It is composed of 5-cells, truncated 5-cells, and bitruncated 5-cells facets in a ratio of 2:2:1. Its vertex figure is a tetrahedral antiprism, with 2 regular tetrahedron, 8 triangular pyramid, and 6 tetragonal disphenoid cells, defining 2 5-cell, 8 truncated 5-cell, and 6 bitruncated 5-cell facets around a vertex.

It can be constructed as five sets of parallel hyperplanes that divide space into two half-spaces. The 3-space hyperplanes contain quarter cubic honeycombs as a collection facets.

==== Alternate names ====
- Cyclotruncated pentachoric tetracomb
- Small truncated-pentachoric tetracomb

=== Truncated 5-cell honeycomb ===
Truncated 4-simplex honeycomb
(No image)
Type	Uniform 4-honeycomb
Schläfli symbol	t_{0,1,2}{3^{[5]}} or t{3^{[5]}}
Coxeter diagram	
4-face types	t_{0,1}{3^{3}} t_{0,1,2}{3^{3}} t_{0,3}{3^{3}}
Cell types	Tetrahedron; Truncated tetrahedron Truncated octahedron Triangular prism
Vertex figure	triangular elongated-antiprismatic pyramid
Symmetry	${\tilde{A}}_4$×2 [3^{[5]}]
Properties	vertex-transitive

The truncated 4-simplex honeycomb or truncated 5-cell honeycomb is a space-filling tessellation honeycomb. It can also be called a cyclocantitruncated 5-cell honeycomb.

==== Alaternate names ====
- Great cyclorhombated pentachoric tetracomb
- Great truncated-pentachoric tetracomb

=== Cantellated 5-cell honeycomb ===
Cantellated 5-cell honeycomb
(No image)
Type	Uniform 4-honeycomb
Schläfli symbol	t_{0,1,3}{3^{[5]}} or rr{3^{[5]}}
Coxeter diagram	
4-face types	t_{0,2}{3^{3}} t_{1,2}{3^{3}} t_{0,1,3}{3^{3}}
Cell types	Truncated tetrahedron Octahedron; Cuboctahedron; Triangular prism Hexagonal prism
Vertex figure	Bidiminished rectified pentachoron
Symmetry	${\tilde{A}}_4$×2 [3^{[5]}]
Properties	vertex-transitive

The cantellated 4-simplex honeycomb or cantellated 5-cell honeycomb is a space-filling tessellation honeycomb. It can also be called a cycloruncitruncated 5-cell honeycomb.

==== Alternate names ====
- Cycloprismatorhombated pentachoric tetracomb
- Great prismatodispentachoric tetracomb

=== Bitruncated 5-cell honeycomb ===
Bitruncated 5-cell honeycomb
(No image)
Type	Uniform 4-honeycomb
Schläfli symbol	t_{0,1,2,3}{3^{[5]}} or 2t{3^{[5]}}
Coxeter diagram	
4-face types	t_{0,1,3}{3^{3}} t_{0,1,2}{3^{3}} t_{0,1,2,3}{3^{3}}
Cell types	Cuboctahedron Truncated octahedron Truncated tetrahedron Hexagonal prism Triangular prism
Vertex figure	tilted rectangular duopyramid
Symmetry	${\tilde{A}}_4$×2 [3^{[5]}]
Properties	vertex-transitive

The bitruncated 4-simplex honeycomb or bitruncated 5-cell honeycomb is a space-filling tessellation honeycomb. It can also be called a cycloruncicantitruncated 5-cell honeycomb.

==== Alternate names ====
- Great cycloprismated pentachoric tetracomb
- Grand prismatodispentachoric tetracomb

=== Omnitruncated 5-cell honeycomb ===
Omnitruncated 4-simplex honeycomb
(No image)
Type	Uniform 4-honeycomb
Family	Omnitruncated simplectic honeycomb
Schläfli symbol	t_{0,1,2,3,4}{3^{[5]}} or tr{3^{[5]}}
Coxeter diagram	
4-face types	t_{0,1,2,3}{3,3,3}
Cell types	t_{0,1,2}{3,3} {6}x{}
Face types	{4} {6}
Vertex figure	Irr. 5-cell
Symmetry	${\tilde{A}}_4$×10, [5[3^{[5]}]]
Properties	vertex-transitive, cell-transitive

The omnitruncated 4-simplex honeycomb or omnitruncated 5-cell honeycomb is a space-filling tessellation honeycomb. It can also be seen as a cyclosteriruncicantitruncated 5-cell honeycomb.

It is composed entirely of omnitruncated 5-cell (omnitruncated 4-simplex) facets.

Coxeter calls this Hinton's honeycomb after C. H. Hinton, who described it in his book The Fourth Dimension in 1906.

The facets of all omnitruncated simplectic honeycombs are called permutohedra and can be positioned in n+1 space with integral coordinates, permutations of the whole numbers (0,1,...,n).

==== Alternate names ====
- Omnitruncated cyclopentachoric tetracomb
- Great-prismatodecachoric tetracomb

==== A_{4}^{*} lattice ====
The A^{*}_{4} lattice is the union of five A_{4} lattices, and is the dual to the omnitruncated 5-cell honeycomb, and therefore the Voronoi cell of this lattice is an omnitruncated 5-cell.

∪ ∪ ∪ ∪ = dual of

== Alternated form ==
This honeycomb can be alternated, creating omnisnub 5-cells with irregular 5-cells created at the deleted vertices. Although it is not uniform, the 5-cells have a symmetry of order 10.

== See also ==
Regular and uniform honeycombs in 4-space:

- Tesseractic honeycomb
- 16-cell honeycomb
- 24-cell honeycomb
- Truncated 24-cell honeycomb
- Snub 24-cell honeycomb

== Notes ==
Fundamental convex regular and uniform honeycombs in dimensions 2–9
Space	Family	${\tilde{A}}_{n-1}$	${\tilde{C}}_{n-1}$	${\tilde{B}}_{n-1}$	${\tilde{D}}_{n-1}$	${\tilde{G}}_2$ / ${\tilde{F}}_4$ / ${\tilde{E}}_{n-1}$
E^{2}	Uniform tiling	0_{[3]}	δ_{3}	hδ_{3}	qδ_{3}	Hexagonal
E^{3}	Uniform convex honeycomb	0_{[4]}	δ_{4}	hδ_{4}	qδ_{4}	
E^{4}	Uniform 4-honeycomb	0_{[5]}	δ_{5}	hδ_{5}	qδ_{5}	24-cell honeycomb
E^{5}	Uniform 5-honeycomb	0_{[6]}	δ_{6}	hδ_{6}	qδ_{6}	
E^{6}	Uniform 6-honeycomb	0_{[7]}	δ_{7}	hδ_{7}	qδ_{7}	2_{22}
E^{7}	Uniform 7-honeycomb	0_{[8]}	δ_{8}	hδ_{8}	qδ_{8}	1_{33} • 3_{31}
E^{8}	Uniform 8-honeycomb	0_{[9]}	δ_{9}	hδ_{9}	qδ_{9}	1_{52} • 2_{51} • 5_{21}
E^{9}	Uniform 9-honeycomb	0_{[10]}	δ_{10}	hδ_{10}	qδ_{10}	
E^{10}	Uniform 10-honeycomb	0_{[11]}	δ_{11}	hδ_{11}	qδ_{11}	
E^{n−1}	Uniform (n−1)-honeycomb	0_{[n]}	δ_{n}	hδ_{n}	qδ_{n}	1_{k2} • 2_{k1} • k_{21}
