= Uniform 2 k1 polytope =

Uniform polytope

In geometry, 2_{k1} polytope is a uniform polytope in n dimensions (n = k + 4) constructed from the E_{n} Coxeter group. The family was named by their Coxeter symbol as 2_{k1} by its bifurcating Coxeter-Dynkin diagram, with a single ring on the end of the 2-node sequence. It can be named by an extended Schläfli symbol {3,3,3^{k,1}}.

== Family members ==
The family starts uniquely as 6-polytopes, but can be extended backwards to include the 5-orthoplex (pentacross) in 5 dimensions, and the 4-simplex (5-cell) in 4 dimensions.

Each polytope is constructed from (n − 1)-simplex and 2_{k−1,1} (n − 1)-polytope facets, each having a vertex figure as an (n − 1)-demicube, {3^{1,n−2,1}}.

The sequence ends with k = 6 (n = 10), as an infinite hyperbolic tessellation of 9-space.

The complete family of 2_{k1} polytopes are:

1. 5-cell: 2_{01}, (5 tetrahedra cells)
2. Pentacross: 2_{11}, (32 5-cell (2_{01}) facets)
3. 2_{21}, (72 5-simplex and 27 5-orthoplex (2_{11}) facets)
4. 2_{31}, (576 6-simplex and 56 2_{21} facets)
5. 2_{41}, (17280 7-simplex and 240 2_{31} facets)
6. 2_{51}, tessellates Euclidean 8-space (∞ 8-simplex and ∞ 2_{41} facets)
7. 2_{61}, tessellates hyperbolic 9-space (∞ 9-simplex and ∞ 2_{51} facets)

== Elements ==
Gosset 2_{k1} figures
n	2_{k1}	Petrie polygon projection	Name Coxeter-Dynkin diagram	Facets		Elements							
n	2_{k1}	Petrie polygon projection	Name Coxeter-Dynkin diagram	2_{k−1,1} polytope	(n − 1)-simplex	Vertices	Edges	Faces	Cells	4-faces	5-faces	6-faces	7-faces
4	2_{01}		5-cell {3^{2,0,1}}	--	5 {3^{3}}	5	10	10	5				
5	2_{11}		pentacross {3^{2,1,1}}	16 {3^{2,0,1}}	16 {3^{4}}	10	40	80	80	32			
6	2_{21}		2 21 polytope {3^{2,2,1}}	27 {3^{2,1,1}}	72 {3^{5}}	27	216	720	1080	648	99		
7	2_{31}		2 31 polytope {3^{2,3,1}}	56 {3^{2,2,1}}	576 {3^{6}}	126	2016	10080	20160	16128	4788	632	
8	2_{41}		2 41 polytope {3^{2,4,1}}	240 {3^{2,3,1}}	17280 {3^{7}}	2160	69120	483840	1209600	1209600	544320	144960	17520
9	2_{51}		2 51 honeycomb (8-space tessellation) {3^{2,5,1}}	∞ {3^{2,4,1}}	∞ {3^{8}}	∞							
10	2_{61}		2 61 honeycomb (9-space tessellation) {3^{2,6,1}}	∞ {3^{2,5,1}}	∞ {3^{9}}	∞							

== See also ==
- k_{21} polytope family
- 1_{k2} polytope family

Fundamental convex regular and uniform polytopes in dimensions 2–10
Family	A_{n}	B_{n}	I_{2}(p) / D_{n}	E_{6} / E_{7} / E_{8} / F_{4} / G_{2}	H_{n}
Regular polygon	Triangle	Square	p-gon	Hexagon	Pentagon
Uniform polyhedron	Tetrahedron	Octahedron • Cube	Demicube		Dodecahedron • Icosahedron
Uniform polychoron	Pentachoron	16-cell • Tesseract	Demitesseract	24-cell	120-cell • 600-cell
Uniform 5-polytope	5-simplex	5-orthoplex • 5-cube	5-demicube		
Uniform 6-polytope	6-simplex	6-orthoplex • 6-cube	6-demicube	1_{22} • 2_{21}	
Uniform 7-polytope	7-simplex	7-orthoplex • 7-cube	7-demicube	1_{32} • 2_{31} • 3_{21}	
Uniform 8-polytope	8-simplex	8-orthoplex • 8-cube	8-demicube	1_{42} • 2_{41} • 4_{21}	
Uniform 9-polytope	9-simplex	9-orthoplex • 9-cube	9-demicube		
Uniform 10-polytope	10-simplex	10-orthoplex • 10-cube	10-demicube		
Uniform n-polytope	n-simplex	n-orthoplex • n-cube	n-demicube	1_{k2} • 2_{k1} • k_{21}	n-pentagonal polytope
Topics: Polytope families • Regular polytope • List of regular polytopes and compounds • Polytope operations

Fundamental convex regular and uniform honeycombs in dimensions 2–9
Space	Family	${\tilde{A}}_{n-1}$	${\tilde{C}}_{n-1}$	${\tilde{B}}_{n-1}$	${\tilde{D}}_{n-1}$	${\tilde{G}}_2$ / ${\tilde{F}}_4$ / ${\tilde{E}}_{n-1}$
E^{2}	Uniform tiling	0_{[3]}	δ_{3}	hδ_{3}	qδ_{3}	Hexagonal
E^{3}	Uniform convex honeycomb	0_{[4]}	δ_{4}	hδ_{4}	qδ_{4}	
E^{4}	Uniform 4-honeycomb	0_{[5]}	δ_{5}	hδ_{5}	qδ_{5}	24-cell honeycomb
E^{5}	Uniform 5-honeycomb	0_{[6]}	δ_{6}	hδ_{6}	qδ_{6}	
E^{6}	Uniform 6-honeycomb	0_{[7]}	δ_{7}	hδ_{7}	qδ_{7}	2_{22}
E^{7}	Uniform 7-honeycomb	0_{[8]}	δ_{8}	hδ_{8}	qδ_{8}	1_{33} • 3_{31}
E^{8}	Uniform 8-honeycomb	0_{[9]}	δ_{9}	hδ_{9}	qδ_{9}	1_{52} • 2_{51} • 5_{21}
E^{9}	Uniform 9-honeycomb	0_{[10]}	δ_{10}	hδ_{10}	qδ_{10}	
E^{10}	Uniform 10-honeycomb	0_{[11]}	δ_{11}	hδ_{11}	qδ_{11}	
E^{n−1}	Uniform (n−1)-honeycomb	0_{[n]}	δ_{n}	hδ_{n}	qδ_{n}	1_{k2} • 2_{k1} • k_{21}
