= Cyclotruncated 5-simplex honeycomb =

Cyclotruncated 5-simplex honeycomb
(No image)
Type	Uniform honeycomb
Family	Cyclotruncated simplectic honeycomb
Schläfli symbol	t_{0,1}{3^{[6]}}
Coxeter diagram	or
5-face types	{3,3,3,3} t{3,3,3,3} 2t{3,3,3,3}
4-face types	{3,3,3} t{3,3,3}
Cell types	{3,3} t{3,3}
Face types	{3} t{3}
Vertex figure	Elongated 5-cell antiprism
Coxeter groups	${\tilde{A}}_5$×2_{2}, [[3^{[6]}]]
Properties	vertex-transitive

In five-dimensional Euclidean geometry, the cyclotruncated 5-simplex honeycomb or cyclotruncated hexateric honeycomb is a space-filling tessellation (or honeycomb). It is composed of 5-simplex, truncated 5-simplex, and bitruncated 5-simplex facets in a ratio of 1:1:1.

== Structure ==
Its vertex figure is an elongated 5-cell antiprism, two parallel 5-cells in dual configurations, connected by 10 tetrahedral pyramids (elongated 5-cells) from the cell of one side to a point on the other. The vertex figure has 8 vertices and 12 5-cells.

It can be constructed as six sets of parallel hyperplanes that divide space. The hyperplane intersections generate cyclotruncated 5-cell honeycomb divisions on each hyperplane.

== Related polytopes and honeycombs ==
This honeycomb is one of 12 unique uniform honeycombs constructed by the ${\tilde{A}}_5$ Coxeter group. The extended symmetry of the hexagonal diagram of the ${\tilde{A}}_5$ Coxeter group allows for automorphisms that map diagram nodes (mirrors) on to each other. So the various 12 honeycombs represent higher symmetries based on the ring arrangement symmetry in the diagrams:

A5 honeycombs
Hexagon symmetry	Extended symmetry	Extended diagram	Extended group	Honeycomb diagrams
a1	[3^{[6]}]		${\tilde{A}}_5$	
d2	<[3^{[6]}]>		${\tilde{A}}_5$×2_{1}	_{1},,,,
p2	[[3^{[6]}]]		${\tilde{A}}_5$×2_{2}	_{2},
i4	[<[3^{[6]}]>]		${\tilde{A}}_5$×2_{1}×2_{2}	,
d6	<3[3^{[6]}]>		${\tilde{A}}_5$×6_{1}	
r12	[6[3^{[6]}]]		${\tilde{A}}_5$×12	_{3}

== See also ==
Regular and uniform honeycombs in 5-space:

- 5-cubic honeycomb
- 5-demicubic honeycomb
- 5-simplex honeycomb
- Omnitruncated 5-simplex honeycomb

== Notes ==
Fundamental convex regular and uniform honeycombs in dimensions 2–9
Space	Family	${\tilde{A}}_{n-1}$	${\tilde{C}}_{n-1}$	${\tilde{B}}_{n-1}$	${\tilde{D}}_{n-1}$	${\tilde{G}}_2$ / ${\tilde{F}}_4$ / ${\tilde{E}}_{n-1}$
E^{2}	Uniform tiling	0_{[3]}	δ_{3}	hδ_{3}	qδ_{3}	Hexagonal
E^{3}	Uniform convex honeycomb	0_{[4]}	δ_{4}	hδ_{4}	qδ_{4}	
E^{4}	Uniform 4-honeycomb	0_{[5]}	δ_{5}	hδ_{5}	qδ_{5}	24-cell honeycomb
E^{5}	Uniform 5-honeycomb	0_{[6]}	δ_{6}	hδ_{6}	qδ_{6}	
E^{6}	Uniform 6-honeycomb	0_{[7]}	δ_{7}	hδ_{7}	qδ_{7}	2_{22}
E^{7}	Uniform 7-honeycomb	0_{[8]}	δ_{8}	hδ_{8}	qδ_{8}	1_{33} • 3_{31}
E^{8}	Uniform 8-honeycomb	0_{[9]}	δ_{9}	hδ_{9}	qδ_{9}	1_{52} • 2_{51} • 5_{21}
E^{9}	Uniform 9-honeycomb	0_{[10]}	δ_{10}	hδ_{10}	qδ_{10}	
E^{10}	Uniform 10-honeycomb	0_{[11]}	δ_{11}	hδ_{11}	qδ_{11}	
E^{n−1}	Uniform (n−1)-honeycomb	0_{[n]}	δ_{n}	hδ_{n}	qδ_{n}	1_{k2} • 2_{k1} • k_{21}
