= Omnitruncated simplicial honeycomb =

In geometry an omnitruncated simplicial honeycomb or omnitruncated n-simplex honeycomb is an n-dimensional uniform tessellation, based on the symmetry of the ${\tilde{A}}_n$ affine Coxeter group. Each is composed of omnitruncated simplex facets. The vertex figure for each is an irregular n-simplex.

The facets of an omnitruncated simplicial honeycomb are called permutahedra and can be positioned in n+1 space with integral coordinates, permutations of the whole numbers (0,1,...,n).

n	${\tilde{A}}_{1+}$	Image	Tessellation	Facets	Vertex figure	Facets per vertex figure	Vertices per vertex figure
1	${\tilde{A}}_1$		Apeirogon	Line segment	Line segment	1	2
2	${\tilde{A}}_2$		Hexagonal tiling	hexagon	Equilateral triangle	3 hexagons	3
3	${\tilde{A}}_3$		Bitruncated cubic honeycomb	Truncated octahedron	irr. tetrahedron	4 truncated octahedron	4
4	${\tilde{A}}_4$		Omnitruncated 4-simplex honeycomb	Omnitruncated 4-simplex	irr. 5-cell	5 omnitruncated 4-simplex	5
5	${\tilde{A}}_5$		Omnitruncated 5-simplex honeycomb	Omnitruncated 5-simplex	irr. 5-simplex	6 omnitruncated 5-simplex	6
6	${\tilde{A}}_6$		Omnitruncated 6-simplex honeycomb	Omnitruncated 6-simplex	irr. 6-simplex	7 omnitruncated 6-simplex	7
7	${\tilde{A}}_7$		Omnitruncated 7-simplex honeycomb	Omnitruncated 7-simplex	irr. 7-simplex	8 omnitruncated 7-simplex	8
8	${\tilde{A}}_8$		Omnitruncated 8-simplex honeycomb	Omnitruncated 8-simplex	irr. 8-simplex	9 omnitruncated 8-simplex	9

== Projection by folding ==
The (2n−1)-simplex honeycombs can be projected into the n-dimensional omnitruncated hypercubic honeycomb by a geometric folding operation that maps two pairs of mirrors into each other, sharing the same vertex arrangement:

${\tilde{A}}_3$	${\tilde{A}}_5$	${\tilde{A}}_7$	${\tilde{A}}_9$	...
${\tilde{C}}_2$	${\tilde{C}}_3$	${\tilde{C}}_4$	${\tilde{C}}_5$	...

== See also ==
- Hypercubic honeycomb
- Alternated hypercubic honeycomb
- Quarter hypercubic honeycomb
- Simplectic honeycomb
- Truncated simplicial honeycomb

Fundamental convex regular and uniform honeycombs in dimensions 2–9
Space	Family	${\tilde{A}}_{n-1}$	${\tilde{C}}_{n-1}$	${\tilde{B}}_{n-1}$	${\tilde{D}}_{n-1}$	${\tilde{G}}_2$ / ${\tilde{F}}_4$ / ${\tilde{E}}_{n-1}$
E^{2}	Uniform tiling	0_{[3]}	δ_{3}	hδ_{3}	qδ_{3}	Hexagonal
E^{3}	Uniform convex honeycomb	0_{[4]}	δ_{4}	hδ_{4}	qδ_{4}	
E^{4}	Uniform 4-honeycomb	0_{[5]}	δ_{5}	hδ_{5}	qδ_{5}	24-cell honeycomb
E^{5}	Uniform 5-honeycomb	0_{[6]}	δ_{6}	hδ_{6}	qδ_{6}	
E^{6}	Uniform 6-honeycomb	0_{[7]}	δ_{7}	hδ_{7}	qδ_{7}	2_{22}
E^{7}	Uniform 7-honeycomb	0_{[8]}	δ_{8}	hδ_{8}	qδ_{8}	1_{33} • 3_{31}
E^{8}	Uniform 8-honeycomb	0_{[9]}	δ_{9}	hδ_{9}	qδ_{9}	1_{52} • 2_{51} • 5_{21}
E^{9}	Uniform 9-honeycomb	0_{[10]}	δ_{10}	hδ_{10}	qδ_{10}	
E^{10}	Uniform 10-honeycomb	0_{[11]}	δ_{11}	hδ_{11}	qδ_{11}	
E^{n−1}	Uniform (n−1)-honeycomb	0_{[n]}	δ_{n}	hδ_{n}	qδ_{n}	1_{k2} • 2_{k1} • k_{21}
