= Cyclotruncated simplicial honeycomb =

In geometry, the cyclotruncated simplicial honeycomb (or cyclotruncated n-simplex honeycomb) is a dimensional infinite series of honeycombs, based on the symmetry of the ${\tilde{A}}_n$ affine Coxeter group. It is given a Schläfli symbol t_{0,1}{3^{[n+1]}}, and is represented by a Coxeter-Dynkin diagram as a cyclic graph of n+1 nodes with two adjacent nodes ringed. It is composed of n-simplex facets, along with all truncated n-simplices.

It is also called a Kagome lattice in two and three dimensions, although it is not a lattice.

In n-dimensions, each can be seen as a set of n+1 sets of parallel hyperplanes that divide space. Each hyperplane contains the same honeycomb of one dimension lower.

In 1-dimension, the honeycomb represents an apeirogon, with alternately colored line segments. In 2-dimensions, the honeycomb represents the trihexagonal tiling, with Coxeter graph. In 3-dimensions it represents the quarter cubic honeycomb, with Coxeter graph filling space with alternately tetrahedral and truncated tetrahedral cells. In 4-dimensions it is called a cyclotruncated 5-cell honeycomb, with Coxeter graph, with 5-cell, truncated 5-cell, and bitruncated 5-cell facets. In 5-dimensions it is called a cyclotruncated 5-simplex honeycomb, with Coxeter graph, filling space by 5-simplex, truncated 5-simplex, and bitruncated 5-simplex facets. In 6-dimensions it is called a cyclotruncated 6-simplex honeycomb, with Coxeter graph, filling space by 6-simplex, truncated 6-simplex, bitruncated 6-simplex, and tritruncated 6-simplex facets.

n	${\tilde{A}}_n$	Name Coxeter diagram	Vertex figure	Image and facets
1	${\tilde{A}}_1$	Apeirogon		Yellow and cyan line segments
2	${\tilde{A}}_2$	Trihexagonal tiling	Rectangle	With yellow and blue equilateral triangles, and red hexagons
3	${\tilde{A}}_3$	quarter cubic honeycomb	Elongated triangular antiprism	With yellow and blue tetrahedra, and red and purple truncated tetrahedra
4	${\tilde{A}}_4$	Cyclotruncated 5-cell honeycomb	Elongated tetrahedral antiprism	5-cell, truncated 5-cell, bitruncated 5-cell
5	${\tilde{A}}_5$	Cyclotruncated 5-simplex honeycomb		5-simplex, truncated 5-simplex, bitruncated 5-simplex
6	${\tilde{A}}_6$	Cyclotruncated 6-simplex honeycomb		6-simplex, truncated 6-simplex, bitruncated 6-simplex, tritruncated 6-simplex
7	${\tilde{A}}_7$	Cyclotruncated 7-simplex honeycomb		7-simplex, truncated 7-simplex, bitruncated 7-simplex
8	${\tilde{A}}_8$	Cyclotruncated 8-simplex honeycomb		8-simplex, truncated 8-simplex, bitruncated 8-simplex, tritruncated 8-simplex, quadritruncated 8-simplex

== Projection by folding ==
The cyclotruncated (2n+1)- and 2n-simplex honeycombs and (2n−1)-simplex honeycombs can be projected into the n-dimensional hypercubic honeycomb by a geometric folding operation that maps two pairs of mirrors into each other, sharing the same vertex arrangement:

${\tilde{A}}_3$	${\tilde{A}}_5$	${\tilde{A}}_7$	${\tilde{A}}_9$	${\tilde{A}}_{11}$	...
${\tilde{A}}_2$	${\tilde{A}}_4$	${\tilde{A}}_6$	${\tilde{A}}_8$	${\tilde{A}}_{10}$	...
	${\tilde{A}}_3$	${\tilde{A}}_5$	${\tilde{A}}_7$	${\tilde{A}}_9$	...
${\tilde{C}}_1$	${\tilde{C}}_2$	${\tilde{C}}_3$	${\tilde{C}}_4$	${\tilde{C}}_5$	...

== See also ==
- Hypercubic honeycomb
- Alternated hypercubic honeycomb
- Quarter hypercubic honeycomb
- Simplectic honeycomb
- Omnitruncated simplicial honeycomb

Fundamental convex regular and uniform honeycombs in dimensions 2–9
Space	Family	${\tilde{A}}_{n-1}$	${\tilde{C}}_{n-1}$	${\tilde{B}}_{n-1}$	${\tilde{D}}_{n-1}$	${\tilde{G}}_2$ / ${\tilde{F}}_4$ / ${\tilde{E}}_{n-1}$
E^{2}	Uniform tiling	0_{[3]}	δ_{3}	hδ_{3}	qδ_{3}	Hexagonal
E^{3}	Uniform convex honeycomb	0_{[4]}	δ_{4}	hδ_{4}	qδ_{4}	
E^{4}	Uniform 4-honeycomb	0_{[5]}	δ_{5}	hδ_{5}	qδ_{5}	24-cell honeycomb
E^{5}	Uniform 5-honeycomb	0_{[6]}	δ_{6}	hδ_{6}	qδ_{6}	
E^{6}	Uniform 6-honeycomb	0_{[7]}	δ_{7}	hδ_{7}	qδ_{7}	2_{22}
E^{7}	Uniform 7-honeycomb	0_{[8]}	δ_{8}	hδ_{8}	qδ_{8}	1_{33} • 3_{31}
E^{8}	Uniform 8-honeycomb	0_{[9]}	δ_{9}	hδ_{9}	qδ_{9}	1_{52} • 2_{51} • 5_{21}
E^{9}	Uniform 9-honeycomb	0_{[10]}	δ_{10}	hδ_{10}	qδ_{10}	
E^{10}	Uniform 10-honeycomb	0_{[11]}	δ_{11}	hδ_{11}	qδ_{11}	
E^{n−1}	Uniform (n−1)-honeycomb	0_{[n]}	δ_{n}	hδ_{n}	qδ_{n}	1_{k2} • 2_{k1} • k_{21}
