= Runcinated 7-cubes =

7-cube	Runcinated 7-cube	Biruncinated 7-cube
Runcitruncated 7-cube	Biruncitruncated 7-cube	Runcicantellated 7-cube
Biruncicantellated 7-cube	Runcicantitruncated 7-cube	Biruncicantitruncated 7-cube
Orthogonal projections in B_{6} Coxeter plane

In seven-dimensional geometry, a runcinated 7-cube is a convex uniform 7-polytope with 3rd order truncations (runcination) of the regular 7-cube.

There are 16 unique runcinations of the 7-cube with permutations of truncations, and cantellations. 8 are more simply constructed from the 7-orthoplex.

These polytopes are among 127 uniform 7-polytopes with B_{7} symmetry.

== Runcinated 7-cube ==
Runcinated 7-cube
Type	uniform 7-polytope
Schläfli symbol	t_{0,3}{4,3^{5}}
Coxeter-Dynkin diagrams	
6-faces	
5-faces	
4-faces	
Cells	
Faces	
Edges	33600
Vertices	4480
Vertex figure	
Coxeter groups	B_{7}, [4,3^{5}]
Properties	convex

=== Alternate names ===
- Small prismated hepteract (acronym: spesa) (Jonathan Bowers)

=== Images ===
Orthographic projections
Coxeter plane	B_{7} / A_{6}	B_{6} / D_{7}	B_{5} / D_{6} / A_{4}
Graph			
Dihedral symmetry	[14]	[12]	[10]
Coxeter plane	B_{4} / D_{5}	B_{3} / D_{4} / A_{2}	B_{2} / D_{3}
Graph			
Dihedral symmetry	[8]	[6]	[4]
Coxeter plane	A_{5}	A_{3}	
Graph			
Dihedral symmetry	[6]	[4]	

== Biruncinated 7-cube ==
Biruncinated 7-cube
Type	uniform 7-polytope
Schläfli symbol	t_{1,4}{4,3^{5}}
Coxeter-Dynkin diagrams	
6-faces	
5-faces	
4-faces	
Cells	
Faces	
Edges	67200
Vertices	8960
Vertex figure	
Coxeter groups	B_{7}, [4,3^{5}]
Properties	convex

=== Alternate names ===
- Small biprismated hepteract (Acronym sibposa) (Jonathan Bowers)

=== Images ===
Orthographic projections
Coxeter plane	B_{7} / A_{6}	B_{6} / D_{7}	B_{5} / D_{6} / A_{4}
Graph			
Dihedral symmetry	[14]	[12]	[10]
Coxeter plane	B_{4} / D_{5}	B_{3} / D_{4} / A_{2}	B_{2} / D_{3}
Graph			
Dihedral symmetry	[8]	[6]	[4]
Coxeter plane	A_{5}	A_{3}	
Graph			
Dihedral symmetry	[6]	[4]	

== Runcitruncated 7-cube ==
Runcitruncated 7-cube
Type	uniform 7-polytope
Schläfli symbol	t_{0,1,3}{4,3^{5}}
Coxeter-Dynkin diagrams	
6-faces	
5-faces	
4-faces	
Cells	
Faces	
Edges	73920
Vertices	13440
Vertex figure	
Coxeter groups	B_{7}, [4,3^{5}]
Properties	convex

=== Alternate names ===
- Prismatotruncated hepteract (acronym: petsa) (Jonathan Bowers)

=== Images ===
Orthographic projections
Coxeter plane	B_{7} / A_{6}	B_{6} / D_{7}	B_{5} / D_{6} / A_{4}
Graph			
Dihedral symmetry	[14]	[12]	[10]
Coxeter plane	B_{4} / D_{5}	B_{3} / D_{4} / A_{2}	B_{2} / D_{3}
Graph			
Dihedral symmetry	[8]	[6]	[4]
Coxeter plane	A_{5}	A_{3}	
Graph			
Dihedral symmetry	[6]	[4]	

== Biruncitruncated 7-cube ==
Biruncitruncated 7-cube
Type	uniform 7-polytope
Schläfli symbol	t_{1,2,4}{4,3^{5}}
Coxeter-Dynkin diagrams	
6-faces	
5-faces	
4-faces	
Cells	
Faces	
Edges	134400
Vertices	26880
Vertex figure	
Coxeter groups	B_{7}, [4,3^{5}]
Properties	convex

=== Alternate names ===
- Biprismatotruncated hepteract (acronym: biptesa) (Jonathan Bowers)

=== Images ===
Orthographic projections
Coxeter plane	B_{7} / A_{6}	B_{6} / D_{7}	B_{5} / D_{6} / A_{4}
Graph			
Dihedral symmetry	[14]	[12]	[10]
Coxeter plane	B_{4} / D_{5}	B_{3} / D_{4} / A_{2}	B_{2} / D_{3}
Graph			
Dihedral symmetry	[8]	[6]	[4]
Coxeter plane	A_{5}	A_{3}	
Graph			
Dihedral symmetry	[6]	[4]	

== Runcicantellated 7-cube ==
Runcicantellated 7-cube
Type	uniform 7-polytope
Schläfli symbol	t_{0,2,3}{4,3^{5}}
Coxeter-Dynkin diagrams	
6-faces	
5-faces	
4-faces	
Cells	
Faces	
Edges	53760
Vertices	13440
Vertex figure	
Coxeter groups	B_{7}, [4,3^{5}]
Properties	convex

=== Alternate names ===
- Prismatorhombated hepteract (acronym: parsa) (Jonathan Bowers)

=== Images ===
Orthographic projections
Coxeter plane	B_{7} / A_{6}	B_{6} / D_{7}	B_{5} / D_{6} / A_{4}
Graph			
Dihedral symmetry	[14]	[12]	[10]
Coxeter plane	B_{4} / D_{5}	B_{3} / D_{4} / A_{2}	B_{2} / D_{3}
Graph			
Dihedral symmetry	[8]	[6]	[4]
Coxeter plane	A_{5}	A_{3}	
Graph			
Dihedral symmetry	[6]	[4]	

== Biruncicantellated 7-cube ==
Biruncicantellated 7-cube
Type	uniform 7-polytope
Schläfli symbol	t_{1,3,4}{4,3^{5}}
Coxeter-Dynkin diagrams	
6-faces	
5-faces	
4-faces	
Cells	
Faces	
Edges	120960
Vertices	26880
Vertex figure	
Coxeter groups	B_{7}, [4,3^{5}]
Properties	convex

=== Alternate names ===
- Biprismatorhombated hepteract (acronym: bopresa) (Jonathan Bowers)

=== Images ===
Orthographic projections
Coxeter plane	B_{7} / A_{6}	B_{6} / D_{7}	B_{5} / D_{6} / A_{4}
Graph			
Dihedral symmetry	[14]	[12]	[10]
Coxeter plane	B_{4} / D_{5}	B_{3} / D_{4} / A_{2}	B_{2} / D_{3}
Graph			
Dihedral symmetry	[8]	[6]	[4]
Coxeter plane	A_{5}	A_{3}	
Graph			
Dihedral symmetry	[6]	[4]	

== Runcicantitruncated 7-cube ==
Runcicantitruncated 7-cube
Type	uniform 7-polytope
Schläfli symbol	t_{0,1,2,3}{4,3^{5}}
Coxeter-Dynkin diagrams	
6-faces	
5-faces	
4-faces	
Cells	
Faces	
Edges	94080
Vertices	26880
Vertex figure	
Coxeter groups	B_{7}, [4,3^{5}]
Properties	convex

=== Alternate names ===
- Great prismated hepteract (acronym: gapsa) (Jonathan Bowers)

=== Images ===
Orthographic projections
Coxeter plane	B_{7} / A_{6}	B_{6} / D_{7}	B_{5} / D_{6} / A_{4}
Graph			
Dihedral symmetry	[14]	[12]	[10]
Coxeter plane	B_{4} / D_{5}	B_{3} / D_{4} / A_{2}	B_{2} / D_{3}
Graph			
Dihedral symmetry	[8]	[6]	[4]
Coxeter plane	A_{5}	A_{3}	
Graph			
Dihedral symmetry	[6]	[4]	

== Biruncicantitruncated 7-cube ==
Biruncicantitruncated 7-cube
Type	uniform 7-polytope
Schläfli symbol	t_{1,2,3,4}{4,3^{5}}
Coxeter-Dynkin diagrams	
6-faces	
5-faces	
4-faces	
Cells	
Faces	
Edges	188160
Vertices	53760
Vertex figure	
Coxeter groups	B_{7}, [4,3^{5}]
Properties	convex

=== Alternate names ===
- Great biprismated hepteract (acronym: gibposa) (Jonathan Bowers)

=== Images ===
Orthographic projections
Coxeter plane	B_{7} / A_{6}	B_{6} / D_{7}	B_{5} / D_{6} / A_{4}
Graph			
Dihedral symmetry	[14]	[12]	[10]
Coxeter plane	B_{4} / D_{5}	B_{3} / D_{4} / A_{2}	B_{2} / D_{3}
Graph			
Dihedral symmetry	[8]	[6]	[4]
Coxeter plane	A_{5}	A_{3}	
Graph			
Dihedral symmetry	[6]	[4]	

== Notes ==
Fundamental convex regular and uniform polytopes in dimensions 2–10
Family	A_{n}	B_{n}	I_{2}(p) / D_{n}	E_{6} / E_{7} / E_{8} / F_{4} / G_{2}	H_{n}
Regular polygon	Triangle	Square	p-gon	Hexagon	Pentagon
Uniform polyhedron	Tetrahedron	Octahedron • Cube	Demicube		Dodecahedron • Icosahedron
Uniform polychoron	Pentachoron	16-cell • Tesseract	Demitesseract	24-cell	120-cell • 600-cell
Uniform 5-polytope	5-simplex	5-orthoplex • 5-cube	5-demicube		
Uniform 6-polytope	6-simplex	6-orthoplex • 6-cube	6-demicube	1_{22} • 2_{21}	
Uniform 7-polytope	7-simplex	7-orthoplex • 7-cube	7-demicube	1_{32} • 2_{31} • 3_{21}	
Uniform 8-polytope	8-simplex	8-orthoplex • 8-cube	8-demicube	1_{42} • 2_{41} • 4_{21}	
Uniform 9-polytope	9-simplex	9-orthoplex • 9-cube	9-demicube		
Uniform 10-polytope	10-simplex	10-orthoplex • 10-cube	10-demicube		
Uniform n-polytope	n-simplex	n-orthoplex • n-cube	n-demicube	1_{k2} • 2_{k1} • k_{21}	n-pentagonal polytope
Topics: Polytope families • Regular polytope • List of regular polytopes and compounds • Polytope operations
