= D7 polytope =

Orthographic projections in the D_{7} Coxeter plane
| 7-demicube | 7-orthoplex |

In 7-dimensional geometry, there are 95 uniform polytopes with D_{7} symmetry; 32 are unique, and 63 are shared with the B_{7} symmetry. There are two regular forms, the 7-orthoplex, and 7-demicube with 14 and 64 vertices respectively.

They can be visualized as symmetric orthographic projections in Coxeter planes of the D_{6} Coxeter group, and other subgroups.

== Graphs ==
Symmetric orthographic projections of these 32 polytopes can be made in the D_{7}, D_{6}, D_{5}, D_{4}, D_{3}, A_{5}, A_{3}, Coxeter planes. A_{k} has [k+1] symmetry, D_{k} has [2(k-1)] symmetry. B_{7} is also included although only half of its [14] symmetry exists in these polytopes.

These 32 polytopes are each shown in these 8 symmetry planes, with vertices and edges drawn, and vertices colored by the number of overlapping vertices in each projective position in progressive order: red, orange, yellow, green, cyan, blue, purple, magenta, red-violet.

| # | Coxeter plane graphs | | | | | | | | Coxeter diagram Names |
| # | B_{7} [14/2] | D_{7} [12] | D_{6} [10] | D_{5} [8] | D_{4} [6] | D_{3} [4] | A_{5} [6] | A_{3} [4] | Coxeter diagram Names |
|---|---|---|---|---|---|---|---|---|---|
| 1 | | | | | | | | | = 7-demicube Demihepteract (Hesa) |
| 2 | | | | | | | | | = Cantic 7-cube Truncated demihepteract (Thesa) |
| 3 | | | | | | | | | = Runcic 7-cube Small rhombated demihepteract (Sirhesa) |
| 4 | | | | | | | | | = Steric 7-cube Small prismated demihepteract (Sphosa) |
| 5 | | | | | | | | | = Pentic 7-cube Small cellated demihepteract (Sochesa) |
| 6 | | | | | | | | | = Hexic 7-cube Small terated demihepteract (Suthesa) |
| 7 | | | | | | | | | = Runcicantic 7-cube Great rhombated demihepteract (Girhesa) |
| 8 | | | | | | | | | = Stericantic 7-cube Prismatotruncated demihepteract (Pothesa) |
| 9 | | | | | | | | | = Steriruncic 7-cube Prismatorhomated demihepteract (Prohesa) |
| 10 | | | | | | | | | = Penticantic 7-cube Cellitruncated demihepteract (Cothesa) |
| 11 | | | | | | | | | = Pentiruncic 7-cube Cellirhombated demihepteract (Crohesa) |
| 12 | | | | | | | | | = Pentisteric 7-cube Celliprismated demihepteract (Caphesa) |
| 13 | | | | | | | | | = Hexicantic 7-cube Teritruncated demihepteract (Tuthesa) |
| 14 | | | | | | | | | = Hexiruncic 7-cube Terirhombated demihepteract (Turhesa) |
| 15 | | | | | | | | | = Hexisteric 7-cube Teriprismated demihepteract (Tuphesa) |
| 16 | | | | | | | | | = Hexipentic 7-cube Tericellated demihepteract (Tuchesa) |
| 17 | | | | | | | | | = Steriruncicantic 7-cube Great prismated demihepteract (Gephosa) |
| 18 | | | | | | | | | = Pentiruncicantic 7-cube Celligreatorhombated demihepteract (Cagrohesa) |
| 19 | | | | | | | | | = Pentistericantic 7-cube Celliprismatotruncated demihepteract (Capthesa) |
| 20 | | | | | | | | | = Pentisteriruncic 7-cube Celliprismatorhombated demihepteract (Coprahesa) |
| 21 | | | | | | | | | = Hexiruncicantic 7-cube Terigreatorhombated demihepteract (Tugrohesa) |
| 22 | | | | | | | | | = Hexistericantic 7-cube Teriprismatotruncated demihepteract (Tupthesa) |
| 23 | | | | | | | | | = Hexisteriruncic 7-cube Teriprismatorhombated demihepteract (Tuprohesa) |
| 24 | | | | | | | | | = Hexipenticantic 7-cube Tericellitruncated demihepteract (Tucothesa) |
| 25 | | | | | | | | | = Hexipentiruncic 7-cube Tericellirhombated demihepteract (Tucrohesa) |
| 26 | | | | | | | | | = Hexipentisteric 7-cube Tericelliprismated demihepteract (Tucophesa) |
| 27 | | | | | | | | | = Pentisteriruncicantic 7-cube Great cellated demihepteract (Gochesa) |
| 28 | | | | | | | | | = Hexisteriruncicantic 7-cube Terigreatoprismated demihepteract (Tugphesa) |
| 29 | | | | | | | | | = Hexipentiruncicantic 7-cube Tericelligreatorhombated demihepteract (Tucagrohesa) |
| 30 | | | | | | | | | = Hexipentistericantic 7-cube Tericelliprismatotruncated demihepteract (Tucpathesa) |
| 31 | | | | | | | | | = Hexipentisteriruncic 7-cube Tericelliprismatorhombated demihepteract (Tucprohesa) |
| 32 | | | | | | | | | = Hexipentisteriruncicantic 7-cube Great terated demihepteract (Guthesa) |

Fundamental convex regular and uniform polytopes in dimensions 2–10
| Family | A_{n} | B_{n} | I_{2}(p) / D_{n} | E_{6} / E_{7} / E_{8} / F_{4} / G_{2} | H_{n} |
| Regular polygon | Triangle | Square | p-gon | Hexagon | Pentagon |
| Uniform polyhedron | Tetrahedron | Octahedron • Cube | Demicube | | Dodecahedron • Icosahedron |
| Uniform polychoron | Pentachoron | 16-cell • Tesseract | Demitesseract | 24-cell | 120-cell • 600-cell |
| Uniform 5-polytope | 5-simplex | 5-orthoplex • 5-cube | 5-demicube | | |
| Uniform 6-polytope | 6-simplex | 6-orthoplex • 6-cube | 6-demicube | 1_{22} • 2_{21} | |
| Uniform 7-polytope | 7-simplex | 7-orthoplex • 7-cube | 7-demicube | 1_{32} • 2_{31} • 3_{21} | |
| Uniform 8-polytope | 8-simplex | 8-orthoplex • 8-cube | 8-demicube | 1_{42} • 2_{41} • 4_{21} | |
| Uniform 9-polytope | 9-simplex | 9-orthoplex • 9-cube | 9-demicube | | |
| Uniform 10-polytope | 10-simplex | 10-orthoplex • 10-cube | 10-demicube | | |
| Uniform n-polytope | n-simplex | n-orthoplex • n-cube | n-demicube | 1_{k2} • 2_{k1} • k_{21} | n-pentagonal polytope |
Topics: Polytope families • Regular polytope • List of regular polytopes and compounds • Polytope operations
