= Uniform 7-polytope =

Seven-dimensional geometric object

Graphs of three regular and related uniform polytopes
7-simplex	Rectified 7-simplex	Truncated 7-simplex
Cantellated 7-simplex	Runcinated 7-simplex	Stericated 7-simplex
Pentellated 7-simplex		Hexicated 7-simplex
7-orthoplex	Truncated 7-orthoplex	Rectified 7-orthoplex
Cantellated 7-orthoplex	Runcinated 7-orthoplex	Stericated 7-orthoplex
Pentellated 7-orthoplex	Hexicated 7-cube	Pentellated 7-cube
Stericated 7-cube	Cantellated 7-cube	Runcinated 7-cube
7-cube	Truncated 7-cube	Rectified 7-cube
7-demicube	Cantic 7-cube	Runcic 7-cube
Steric 7-cube	Pentic 7-cube	Hexic 7-cube
3_{21}	2_{31}	1_{32}

In seven-dimensional geometry, a 7-polytope is a polytope contained by 6-polytope facets. Each 5-polytope ridge being shared by exactly two 6-polytope facets.

A uniform 7-polytope is one whose symmetry group is transitive on vertices and whose facets are uniform 6-polytopes.

== Regular 7-polytopes ==
Regular 7-polytopes are represented by the Schläfli symbol {p,q,r,s,t,u} with u {p,q,r,s,t} 6-polytopes facets around each 4-face.

There are exactly three such convex regular 7-polytopes:

1. {3,3,3,3,3,3} - 7-simplex
2. {4,3,3,3,3,3} - 7-cube
3. {3,3,3,3,3,4} - 7-orthoplex

There are no nonconvex regular 7-polytopes.

== Characteristics ==
The topology of any given 7-polytope is defined by its Betti numbers and torsion coefficients.

The value of the Euler characteristic used to characterise polyhedra does not generalize usefully to higher dimensions, whatever their underlying topology. This inadequacy of the Euler characteristic to reliably distinguish between different topologies in higher dimensions led to the discovery of the more sophisticated Betti numbers.

Similarly, the notion of orientability of a polyhedron is insufficient to characterise the surface twistings of toroidal polytopes, and this led to the use of torsion coefficients.

== Uniform 7-polytopes by fundamental Coxeter groups ==
Uniform 7-polytopes with reflective symmetry can be generated by these four Coxeter groups, represented by permutations of rings of the Coxeter-Dynkin diagrams:

#	Coxeter group		Regular and semiregular forms	Uniform count
1	A_{7}	[3^{6}]	7-simplex - {3^{6}},	71
2	B_{7}	[4,3^{5}]	7-cube - {4,3^{5}}, 7-orthoplex - {3^{5},4}, 7-demicube - h{4,3^{5}},	127 + 32
3	D_{7}	[3^{3,1,1}]	7-demicube, {3,3^{4,1}}, 7-orthoplex, {3^{4},3^{1,1}},	95 (0 unique)
4	E_{7}	[3^{3,2,1}]	3_{21} -; 1_{32} -; 2_{31} -	127

Prismatic finite Coxeter groups
#	Coxeter group		Coxeter diagram
6+1
1	A_{6}A_{1}	[3^{5}]×[ ]	
2	BC_{6}A_{1}	[4,3^{4}]×[ ]	
3	D_{6}A_{1}	[3^{3,1,1}]×[ ]	
4	E_{6}A_{1}	[3^{2,2,1}]×[ ]	
5+2
1	A_{5}I_{2}(p)	[3,3,3]×[p]	
2	BC_{5}I_{2}(p)	[4,3,3]×[p]	
3	D_{5}I_{2}(p)	[3^{2,1,1}]×[p]	
5+1+1
1	A_{5}A_{1}^{2}	[3,3,3]×[ ]^{2}	
2	BC_{5}A_{1}^{2}	[4,3,3]×[ ]^{2}	
3	D_{5}A_{1}^{2}	[3^{2,1,1}]×[ ]^{2}	
4+3
1	A_{4}A_{3}	[3,3,3]×[3,3]	
2	A_{4}B_{3}	[3,3,3]×[4,3]	
3	A_{4}H_{3}	[3,3,3]×[5,3]	
4	BC_{4}A_{3}	[4,3,3]×[3,3]	
5	BC_{4}B_{3}	[4,3,3]×[4,3]	
6	BC_{4}H_{3}	[4,3,3]×[5,3]	
7	H_{4}A_{3}	[5,3,3]×[3,3]	
8	H_{4}B_{3}	[5,3,3]×[4,3]	
9	H_{4}H_{3}	[5,3,3]×[5,3]	
10	F_{4}A_{3}	[3,4,3]×[3,3]	
11	F_{4}B_{3}	[3,4,3]×[4,3]	
12	F_{4}H_{3}	[3,4,3]×[5,3]	
13	D_{4}A_{3}	[3^{1,1,1}]×[3,3]	
14	D_{4}B_{3}	[3^{1,1,1}]×[4,3]	
15	D_{4}H_{3}	[3^{1,1,1}]×[5,3]	
4+2+1
1	A_{4}I_{2}(p)A_{1}	[3,3,3]×[p]×[ ]	
2	BC_{4}I_{2}(p)A_{1}	[4,3,3]×[p]×[ ]	
3	F_{4}I_{2}(p)A_{1}	[3,4,3]×[p]×[ ]	
4	H_{4}I_{2}(p)A_{1}	[5,3,3]×[p]×[ ]	
5	D_{4}I_{2}(p)A_{1}	[3^{1,1,1}]×[p]×[ ]	
4+1+1+1
1	A_{4}A_{1}^{3}	[3,3,3]×[ ]^{3}	
2	BC_{4}A_{1}^{3}	[4,3,3]×[ ]^{3}	
3	F_{4}A_{1}^{3}	[3,4,3]×[ ]^{3}	
4	H_{4}A_{1}^{3}	[5,3,3]×[ ]^{3}	
5	D_{4}A_{1}^{3}	[3^{1,1,1}]×[ ]^{3}	
3+3+1
1	A_{3}A_{3}A_{1}	[3,3]×[3,3]×[ ]	
2	A_{3}B_{3}A_{1}	[3,3]×[4,3]×[ ]	
3	A_{3}H_{3}A_{1}	[3,3]×[5,3]×[ ]	
4	BC_{3}B_{3}A_{1}	[4,3]×[4,3]×[ ]	
5	BC_{3}H_{3}A_{1}	[4,3]×[5,3]×[ ]	
6	H_{3}A_{3}A_{1}	[5,3]×[5,3]×[ ]	
3+2+2
1	A_{3}I_{2}(p)I_{2}(q)	[3,3]×[p]×[q]	
2	BC_{3}I_{2}(p)I_{2}(q)	[4,3]×[p]×[q]	
3	H_{3}I_{2}(p)I_{2}(q)	[5,3]×[p]×[q]	
3+2+1+1
1	A_{3}I_{2}(p)A_{1}^{2}	[3,3]×[p]×[ ]^{2}	
2	BC_{3}I_{2}(p)A_{1}^{2}	[4,3]×[p]×[ ]^{2}	
3	H_{3}I_{2}(p)A_{1}^{2}	[5,3]×[p]×[ ]^{2}	
3+1+1+1+1
1	A_{3}A_{1}^{4}	[3,3]×[ ]^{4}	
2	BC_{3}A_{1}^{4}	[4,3]×[ ]^{4}	
3	H_{3}A_{1}^{4}	[5,3]×[ ]^{4}	
2+2+2+1
1	I_{2}(p)I_{2}(q)I_{2}(r)A_{1}	[p]×[q]×[r]×[ ]	
2+2+1+1+1
1	I_{2}(p)I_{2}(q)A_{1}^{3}	[p]×[q]×[ ]^{3}	
2+1+1+1+1+1
1	I_{2}(p)A_{1}^{5}	[p]×[ ]^{5}	
1+1+1+1+1+1+1
1	A_{1}^{7}	[ ]^{7}	

== The A_{7} family ==
The A_{7} family has symmetry of order 40320 (8 factorial).

There are 71 (64 + 8 − 1) forms based on all permutations of the Coxeter-Dynkin diagrams with one or more rings. All 71 are enumerated below. Norman Johnson's truncation names are given. Bowers names and acronym are also given for cross-referencing.

See also a list of A7 polytopes for symmetric Coxeter plane graphs of these polytopes.

A_{7} uniform polytopes
#	Coxeter-Dynkin diagram	Truncation indices	Johnson name Bowers name (and acronym)	Basepoint	Element counts						
#	Coxeter-Dynkin diagram	Truncation indices	Johnson name Bowers name (and acronym)	Basepoint	6	5	4	3	2	1	0
1		t_{0}	7-simplex (oca)	(0,0,0,0,0,0,0,1)	8	28	56	70	56	28	8
2		t_{1}	Rectified 7-simplex (roc)	(0,0,0,0,0,0,1,1)	16	84	224	350	336	168	28
3		t_{2}	Birectified 7-simplex (broc)	(0,0,0,0,0,1,1,1)	16	112	392	770	840	420	56
4		t_{3}	Trirectified 7-simplex (he)	(0,0,0,0,1,1,1,1)	16	112	448	980	1120	560	70
5		t_{0,1}	Truncated 7-simplex (toc)	(0,0,0,0,0,0,1,2)	16	84	224	350	336	196	56
6		t_{0,2}	Cantellated 7-simplex (saro)	(0,0,0,0,0,1,1,2)	44	308	980	1750	1876	1008	168
7		t_{1,2}	Bitruncated 7-simplex (bittoc)	(0,0,0,0,0,1,2,2)						588	168
8		t_{0,3}	Runcinated 7-simplex (spo)	(0,0,0,0,1,1,1,2)	100	756	2548	4830	4760	2100	280
9		t_{1,3}	Bicantellated 7-simplex (sabro)	(0,0,0,0,1,1,2,2)						2520	420
10		t_{2,3}	Tritruncated 7-simplex (tattoc)	(0,0,0,0,1,2,2,2)						980	280
11		t_{0,4}	Stericated 7-simplex (sco)	(0,0,0,1,1,1,1,2)						2240	280
12		t_{1,4}	Biruncinated 7-simplex (sibpo)	(0,0,0,1,1,1,2,2)						4200	560
13		t_{2,4}	Tricantellated 7-simplex (stiroh)	(0,0,0,1,1,2,2,2)						3360	560
14		t_{0,5}	Pentellated 7-simplex (seto)	(0,0,1,1,1,1,1,2)						1260	168
15		t_{1,5}	Bistericated 7-simplex (sabach)	(0,0,1,1,1,1,2,2)						3360	420
16		t_{0,6}	Hexicated 7-simplex (suph)	(0,1,1,1,1,1,1,2)						336	56
17		t_{0,1,2}	Cantitruncated 7-simplex (garo)	(0,0,0,0,0,1,2,3)						1176	336
18		t_{0,1,3}	Runcitruncated 7-simplex (patto)	(0,0,0,0,1,1,2,3)						4620	840
19		t_{0,2,3}	Runcicantellated 7-simplex (paro)	(0,0,0,0,1,2,2,3)						3360	840
20		t_{1,2,3}	Bicantitruncated 7-simplex (gabro)	(0,0,0,0,1,2,3,3)						2940	840
21		t_{0,1,4}	Steritruncated 7-simplex (cato)	(0,0,0,1,1,1,2,3)						7280	1120
22		t_{0,2,4}	Stericantellated 7-simplex (caro)	(0,0,0,1,1,2,2,3)						10080	1680
23		t_{1,2,4}	Biruncitruncated 7-simplex (bipto)	(0,0,0,1,1,2,3,3)						8400	1680
24		t_{0,3,4}	Steriruncinated 7-simplex (cepo)	(0,0,0,1,2,2,2,3)						5040	1120
25		t_{1,3,4}	Biruncicantellated 7-simplex (bipro)	(0,0,0,1,2,2,3,3)						7560	1680
26		t_{2,3,4}	Tricantitruncated 7-simplex (gatroh)	(0,0,0,1,2,3,3,3)						3920	1120
27		t_{0,1,5}	Pentitruncated 7-simplex (teto)	(0,0,1,1,1,1,2,3)						5460	840
28		t_{0,2,5}	Penticantellated 7-simplex (tero)	(0,0,1,1,1,2,2,3)						11760	1680
29		t_{1,2,5}	Bisteritruncated 7-simplex (bacto)	(0,0,1,1,1,2,3,3)						9240	1680
30		t_{0,3,5}	Pentiruncinated 7-simplex (tepo)	(0,0,1,1,2,2,2,3)						10920	1680
31		t_{1,3,5}	Bistericantellated 7-simplex (bacroh)	(0,0,1,1,2,2,3,3)						15120	2520
32		t_{0,4,5}	Pentistericated 7-simplex (teco)	(0,0,1,2,2,2,2,3)						4200	840
33		t_{0,1,6}	Hexitruncated 7-simplex (puto)	(0,1,1,1,1,1,2,3)						1848	336
34		t_{0,2,6}	Hexicantellated 7-simplex (puro)	(0,1,1,1,1,2,2,3)						5880	840
35		t_{0,3,6}	Hexiruncinated 7-simplex (puph)	(0,1,1,1,2,2,2,3)						8400	1120
36		t_{0,1,2,3}	Runcicantitruncated 7-simplex (gapo)	(0,0,0,0,1,2,3,4)						5880	1680
37		t_{0,1,2,4}	Stericantitruncated 7-simplex (cagro)	(0,0,0,1,1,2,3,4)						16800	3360
38		t_{0,1,3,4}	Steriruncitruncated 7-simplex (capto)	(0,0,0,1,2,2,3,4)						13440	3360
39		t_{0,2,3,4}	Steriruncicantellated 7-simplex (capro)	(0,0,0,1,2,3,3,4)						13440	3360
40		t_{1,2,3,4}	Biruncicantitruncated 7-simplex (gibpo)	(0,0,0,1,2,3,4,4)						11760	3360
41		t_{0,1,2,5}	Penticantitruncated 7-simplex (tegro)	(0,0,1,1,1,2,3,4)						18480	3360
42		t_{0,1,3,5}	Pentiruncitruncated 7-simplex (tapto)	(0,0,1,1,2,2,3,4)						27720	5040
43		t_{0,2,3,5}	Pentiruncicantellated 7-simplex (tapro)	(0,0,1,1,2,3,3,4)						25200	5040
44		t_{1,2,3,5}	Bistericantitruncated 7-simplex (bacogro)	(0,0,1,1,2,3,4,4)						22680	5040
45		t_{0,1,4,5}	Pentisteritruncated 7-simplex (tecto)	(0,0,1,2,2,2,3,4)						15120	3360
46		t_{0,2,4,5}	Pentistericantellated 7-simplex (tecro)	(0,0,1,2,2,3,3,4)						25200	5040
47		t_{1,2,4,5}	Bisteriruncitruncated 7-simplex (bicpath)	(0,0,1,2,2,3,4,4)						20160	5040
48		t_{0,3,4,5}	Pentisteriruncinated 7-simplex (tacpo)	(0,0,1,2,3,3,3,4)						15120	3360
49		t_{0,1,2,6}	Hexicantitruncated 7-simplex (pugro)	(0,1,1,1,1,2,3,4)						8400	1680
50		t_{0,1,3,6}	Hexiruncitruncated 7-simplex (pugato)	(0,1,1,1,2,2,3,4)						20160	3360
51		t_{0,2,3,6}	Hexiruncicantellated 7-simplex (pugro)	(0,1,1,1,2,3,3,4)						16800	3360
52		t_{0,1,4,6}	Hexisteritruncated 7-simplex (pucto)	(0,1,1,2,2,2,3,4)						20160	3360
53		t_{0,2,4,6}	Hexistericantellated 7-simplex (pucroh)	(0,1,1,2,2,3,3,4)						30240	5040
54		t_{0,1,5,6}	Hexipentitruncated 7-simplex (putath)	(0,1,2,2,2,2,3,4)						8400	1680
55		t_{0,1,2,3,4}	Steriruncicantitruncated 7-simplex (gecco)	(0,0,0,1,2,3,4,5)						23520	6720
56		t_{0,1,2,3,5}	Pentiruncicantitruncated 7-simplex (tegapo)	(0,0,1,1,2,3,4,5)						45360	10080
57		t_{0,1,2,4,5}	Pentistericantitruncated 7-simplex (tecagro)	(0,0,1,2,2,3,4,5)						40320	10080
58		t_{0,1,3,4,5}	Pentisteriruncitruncated 7-simplex (tacpeto)	(0,0,1,2,3,3,4,5)						40320	10080
59		t_{0,2,3,4,5}	Pentisteriruncicantellated 7-simplex (tacpro)	(0,0,1,2,3,4,4,5)						40320	10080
60		t_{1,2,3,4,5}	Bisteriruncicantitruncated 7-simplex (gabach)	(0,0,1,2,3,4,5,5)						35280	10080
61		t_{0,1,2,3,6}	Hexiruncicantitruncated 7-simplex (pugopo)	(0,1,1,1,2,3,4,5)						30240	6720
62		t_{0,1,2,4,6}	Hexistericantitruncated 7-simplex (pucagro)	(0,1,1,2,2,3,4,5)						50400	10080
63		t_{0,1,3,4,6}	Hexisteriruncitruncated 7-simplex (pucpato)	(0,1,1,2,3,3,4,5)						45360	10080
64		t_{0,2,3,4,6}	Hexisteriruncicantellated 7-simplex (pucproh)	(0,1,1,2,3,4,4,5)						45360	10080
65		t_{0,1,2,5,6}	Hexipenticantitruncated 7-simplex (putagro)	(0,1,2,2,2,3,4,5)						30240	6720
66		t_{0,1,3,5,6}	Hexipentiruncitruncated 7-simplex (putpath)	(0,1,2,2,3,3,4,5)						50400	10080
67		t_{0,1,2,3,4,5}	Pentisteriruncicantitruncated 7-simplex (geto)	(0,0,1,2,3,4,5,6)						70560	20160
68		t_{0,1,2,3,4,6}	Hexisteriruncicantitruncated 7-simplex (pugaco)	(0,1,1,2,3,4,5,6)						80640	20160
69		t_{0,1,2,3,5,6}	Hexipentiruncicantitruncated 7-simplex (putgapo)	(0,1,2,2,3,4,5,6)						80640	20160
70		t_{0,1,2,4,5,6}	Hexipentistericantitruncated 7-simplex (putcagroh)	(0,1,2,3,3,4,5,6)						80640	20160
71		t_{0,1,2,3,4,5,6}	Omnitruncated 7-simplex (guph)	(0,1,2,3,4,5,6,7)						141120	40320

== The B_{7} family ==
The B_{7} family has symmetry of order 645120 (7 factorial x 2^{7}).

There are 127 forms based on all permutations of the Coxeter-Dynkin diagrams with one or more rings. Bowers names and acronym are given for cross-referencing.

See also a list of B7 polytopes for symmetric Coxeter plane graphs of these polytopes.

B_{7} uniform polytopes
#	Coxeter-Dynkin diagram t-notation	Name (BSA)	Base point	Element counts						
#	Coxeter-Dynkin diagram t-notation	Name (BSA)	Base point	6	5	4	3	2	1	0
1	t_{0}{3,3,3,3,3,4}	7-orthoplex (zee)	(0,0,0,0,0,0,1)√2	128	448	672	560	280	84	14
2	t_{1}{3,3,3,3,3,4}	Rectified 7-orthoplex (rez)	(0,0,0,0,0,1,1)√2	142	1344	3360	3920	2520	840	84
3	t_{2}{3,3,3,3,3,4}	Birectified 7-orthoplex (barz)	(0,0,0,0,1,1,1)√2	142	1428	6048	10640	8960	3360	280
4	t_{3}{4,3,3,3,3,3}	Trirectified 7-cube (sez)	(0,0,0,1,1,1,1)√2	142	1428	6328	14560	15680	6720	560
5	t_{2}{4,3,3,3,3,3}	Birectified 7-cube (bersa)	(0,0,1,1,1,1,1)√2	142	1428	5656	11760	13440	6720	672
6	t_{1}{4,3,3,3,3,3}	Rectified 7-cube (rasa)	(0,1,1,1,1,1,1)√2	142	980	2968	5040	5152	2688	448
7	t_{0}{4,3,3,3,3,3}	7-cube (hept)	(0,0,0,0,0,0,0)√2 + (1,1,1,1,1,1,1)	14	84	280	560	672	448	128
8	t_{0,1}{3,3,3,3,3,4}	Truncated 7-orthoplex (Taz)	(0,0,0,0,0,1,2)√2	142	1344	3360	4760	2520	924	168
9	t_{0,2}{3,3,3,3,3,4}	Cantellated 7-orthoplex (Sarz)	(0,0,0,0,1,1,2)√2	226	4200	15456	24080	19320	7560	840
10	t_{1,2}{3,3,3,3,3,4}	Bitruncated 7-orthoplex (Botaz)	(0,0,0,0,1,2,2)√2						4200	840
11	t_{0,3}{3,3,3,3,3,4}	Runcinated 7-orthoplex (Spaz)	(0,0,0,1,1,1,2)√2						23520	2240
12	t_{1,3}{3,3,3,3,3,4}	Bicantellated 7-orthoplex (Sebraz)	(0,0,0,1,1,2,2)√2						26880	3360
13	t_{2,3}{3,3,3,3,3,4}	Tritruncated 7-orthoplex (Totaz)	(0,0,0,1,2,2,2)√2						10080	2240
14	t_{0,4}{3,3,3,3,3,4}	Stericated 7-orthoplex (Scaz)	(0,0,1,1,1,1,2)√2						33600	3360
15	t_{1,4}{3,3,3,3,3,4}	Biruncinated 7-orthoplex (Sibpaz)	(0,0,1,1,1,2,2)√2						60480	6720
16	t_{2,4}{4,3,3,3,3,3}	Tricantellated 7-cube (Strasaz)	(0,0,1,1,2,2,2)√2						47040	6720
17	t_{2,3}{4,3,3,3,3,3}	Tritruncated 7-cube (Tatsa)	(0,0,1,2,2,2,2)√2						13440	3360
18	t_{0,5}{3,3,3,3,3,4}	Pentellated 7-orthoplex (Staz)	(0,1,1,1,1,1,2)√2						20160	2688
19	t_{1,5}{4,3,3,3,3,3}	Bistericated 7-cube (Sabcosaz)	(0,1,1,1,1,2,2)√2						53760	6720
20	t_{1,4}{4,3,3,3,3,3}	Biruncinated 7-cube (Sibposa)	(0,1,1,1,2,2,2)√2						67200	8960
21	t_{1,3}{4,3,3,3,3,3}	Bicantellated 7-cube (Sibrosa)	(0,1,1,2,2,2,2)√2						40320	6720
22	t_{1,2}{4,3,3,3,3,3}	Bitruncated 7-cube (Betsa)	(0,1,2,2,2,2,2)√2						9408	2688
23	t_{0,6}{4,3,3,3,3,3}	Hexicated 7-cube (Supposaz)	(0,0,0,0,0,0,1)√2 + (1,1,1,1,1,1,1)						5376	896
24	t_{0,5}{4,3,3,3,3,3}	Pentellated 7-cube (Stesa)	(0,0,0,0,0,1,1)√2 + (1,1,1,1,1,1,1)						20160	2688
25	t_{0,4}{4,3,3,3,3,3}	Stericated 7-cube (Scosa)	(0,0,0,0,1,1,1)√2 + (1,1,1,1,1,1,1)						35840	4480
26	t_{0,3}{4,3,3,3,3,3}	Runcinated 7-cube (Spesa)	(0,0,0,1,1,1,1)√2 + (1,1,1,1,1,1,1)						33600	4480
27	t_{0,2}{4,3,3,3,3,3}	Cantellated 7-cube (Sersa)	(0,0,1,1,1,1,1)√2 + (1,1,1,1,1,1,1)						16128	2688
28	t_{0,1}{4,3,3,3,3,3}	Truncated 7-cube (Tasa)	(0,1,1,1,1,1,1)√2 + (1,1,1,1,1,1,1)	142	980	2968	5040	5152	3136	896
29	t_{0,1,2}{3,3,3,3,3,4}	Cantitruncated 7-orthoplex (Garz)	(0,1,2,3,3,3,3)√2						8400	1680
30	t_{0,1,3}{3,3,3,3,3,4}	Runcitruncated 7-orthoplex (Potaz)	(0,1,2,2,3,3,3)√2						50400	6720
31	t_{0,2,3}{3,3,3,3,3,4}	Runcicantellated 7-orthoplex (Parz)	(0,1,1,2,3,3,3)√2						33600	6720
32	t_{1,2,3}{3,3,3,3,3,4}	Bicantitruncated 7-orthoplex (Gebraz)	(0,0,1,2,3,3,3)√2						30240	6720
33	t_{0,1,4}{3,3,3,3,3,4}	Steritruncated 7-orthoplex (Catz)	(0,0,1,1,1,2,3)√2						107520	13440
34	t_{0,2,4}{3,3,3,3,3,4}	Stericantellated 7-orthoplex (Craze)	(0,0,1,1,2,2,3)√2						141120	20160
35	t_{1,2,4}{3,3,3,3,3,4}	Biruncitruncated 7-orthoplex (Baptize)	(0,0,1,1,2,3,3)√2						120960	20160
36	t_{0,3,4}{3,3,3,3,3,4}	Steriruncinated 7-orthoplex (Copaz)	(0,1,1,1,2,3,3)√2						67200	13440
37	t_{1,3,4}{3,3,3,3,3,4}	Biruncicantellated 7-orthoplex (Boparz)	(0,0,1,2,2,3,3)√2						100800	20160
38	t_{2,3,4}{4,3,3,3,3,3}	Tricantitruncated 7-cube (Gotrasaz)	(0,0,0,1,2,3,3)√2						53760	13440
39	t_{0,1,5}{3,3,3,3,3,4}	Pentitruncated 7-orthoplex (Tetaz)	(0,1,1,1,1,2,3)√2						87360	13440
40	t_{0,2,5}{3,3,3,3,3,4}	Penticantellated 7-orthoplex (Teroz)	(0,1,1,1,2,2,3)√2						188160	26880
41	t_{1,2,5}{3,3,3,3,3,4}	Bisteritruncated 7-orthoplex (Boctaz)	(0,1,1,1,2,3,3)√2						147840	26880
42	t_{0,3,5}{3,3,3,3,3,4}	Pentiruncinated 7-orthoplex (Topaz)	(0,1,1,2,2,2,3)√2						174720	26880
43	t_{1,3,5}{4,3,3,3,3,3}	Bistericantellated 7-cube (Bacresaz)	(0,1,1,2,2,3,3)√2						241920	40320
44	t_{1,3,4}{4,3,3,3,3,3}	Biruncicantellated 7-cube (Bopresa)	(0,1,1,2,3,3,3)√2						120960	26880
45	t_{0,4,5}{3,3,3,3,3,4}	Pentistericated 7-orthoplex (Tocaz)	(0,1,2,2,2,2,3)√2						67200	13440
46	t_{1,2,5}{4,3,3,3,3,3}	Bisteritruncated 7-cube (Bactasa)	(0,1,2,2,2,3,3)√2						147840	26880
47	t_{1,2,4}{4,3,3,3,3,3}	Biruncitruncated 7-cube (Biptesa)	(0,1,2,2,3,3,3)√2						134400	26880
48	t_{1,2,3}{4,3,3,3,3,3}	Bicantitruncated 7-cube (Gibrosa)	(0,1,2,3,3,3,3)√2						47040	13440
49	t_{0,1,6}{3,3,3,3,3,4}	Hexitruncated 7-orthoplex (Putaz)	(0,0,0,0,0,1,2)√2 + (1,1,1,1,1,1,1)						29568	5376
50	t_{0,2,6}{3,3,3,3,3,4}	Hexicantellated 7-orthoplex (Puraz)	(0,0,0,0,1,1,2)√2 + (1,1,1,1,1,1,1)						94080	13440
51	t_{0,4,5}{4,3,3,3,3,3}	Pentistericated 7-cube (Tacosa)	(0,0,0,0,1,2,2)√2 + (1,1,1,1,1,1,1)						67200	13440
52	t_{0,3,6}{4,3,3,3,3,3}	Hexiruncinated 7-cube (Pupsez)	(0,0,0,1,1,1,2)√2 + (1,1,1,1,1,1,1)						134400	17920
53	t_{0,3,5}{4,3,3,3,3,3}	Pentiruncinated 7-cube (Tapsa)	(0,0,0,1,1,2,2)√2 + (1,1,1,1,1,1,1)						174720	26880
54	t_{0,3,4}{4,3,3,3,3,3}	Steriruncinated 7-cube (Capsa)	(0,0,0,1,2,2,2)√2 + (1,1,1,1,1,1,1)						80640	17920
55	t_{0,2,6}{4,3,3,3,3,3}	Hexicantellated 7-cube (Purosa)	(0,0,1,1,1,1,2)√2 + (1,1,1,1,1,1,1)						94080	13440
56	t_{0,2,5}{4,3,3,3,3,3}	Penticantellated 7-cube (Tersa)	(0,0,1,1,1,2,2)√2 + (1,1,1,1,1,1,1)						188160	26880
57	t_{0,2,4}{4,3,3,3,3,3}	Stericantellated 7-cube (Carsa)	(0,0,1,1,2,2,2)√2 + (1,1,1,1,1,1,1)						161280	26880
58	t_{0,2,3}{4,3,3,3,3,3}	Runcicantellated 7-cube (Parsa)	(0,0,1,2,2,2,2)√2 + (1,1,1,1,1,1,1)						53760	13440
59	t_{0,1,6}{4,3,3,3,3,3}	Hexitruncated 7-cube (Putsa)	(0,1,1,1,1,1,2)√2 + (1,1,1,1,1,1,1)						29568	5376
60	t_{0,1,5}{4,3,3,3,3,3}	Pentitruncated 7-cube (Tetsa)	(0,1,1,1,1,2,2)√2 + (1,1,1,1,1,1,1)						87360	13440
61	t_{0,1,4}{4,3,3,3,3,3}	Steritruncated 7-cube (Catsa)	(0,1,1,1,2,2,2)√2 + (1,1,1,1,1,1,1)						116480	17920
62	t_{0,1,3}{4,3,3,3,3,3}	Runcitruncated 7-cube (Petsa)	(0,1,1,2,2,2,2)√2 + (1,1,1,1,1,1,1)						73920	13440
63	t_{0,1,2}{4,3,3,3,3,3}	Cantitruncated 7-cube (Gersa)	(0,1,2,2,2,2,2)√2 + (1,1,1,1,1,1,1)						18816	5376
64	t_{0,1,2,3}{3,3,3,3,3,4}	Runcicantitruncated 7-orthoplex (Gopaz)	(0,1,2,3,4,4,4)√2						60480	13440
65	t_{0,1,2,4}{3,3,3,3,3,4}	Stericantitruncated 7-orthoplex (Cogarz)	(0,0,1,1,2,3,4)√2						241920	40320
66	t_{0,1,3,4}{3,3,3,3,3,4}	Steriruncitruncated 7-orthoplex (Captaz)	(0,0,1,2,2,3,4)√2						181440	40320
67	t_{0,2,3,4}{3,3,3,3,3,4}	Steriruncicantellated 7-orthoplex (Caparz)	(0,0,1,2,3,3,4)√2						181440	40320
68	t_{1,2,3,4}{3,3,3,3,3,4}	Biruncicantitruncated 7-orthoplex (Gibpaz)	(0,0,1,2,3,4,4)√2						161280	40320
69	t_{0,1,2,5}{3,3,3,3,3,4}	Penticantitruncated 7-orthoplex (Tograz)	(0,1,1,1,2,3,4)√2						295680	53760
70	t_{0,1,3,5}{3,3,3,3,3,4}	Pentiruncitruncated 7-orthoplex (Toptaz)	(0,1,1,2,2,3,4)√2						443520	80640
71	t_{0,2,3,5}{3,3,3,3,3,4}	Pentiruncicantellated 7-orthoplex (Toparz)	(0,1,1,2,3,3,4)√2						403200	80640
72	t_{1,2,3,5}{3,3,3,3,3,4}	Bistericantitruncated 7-orthoplex (Becogarz)	(0,1,1,2,3,4,4)√2						362880	80640
73	t_{0,1,4,5}{3,3,3,3,3,4}	Pentisteritruncated 7-orthoplex (Tacotaz)	(0,1,2,2,2,3,4)√2						241920	53760
74	t_{0,2,4,5}{3,3,3,3,3,4}	Pentistericantellated 7-orthoplex (Tocarz)	(0,1,2,2,3,3,4)√2						403200	80640
75	t_{1,2,4,5}{4,3,3,3,3,3}	Bisteriruncitruncated 7-cube (Bocaptosaz)	(0,1,2,2,3,4,4)√2						322560	80640
76	t_{0,3,4,5}{3,3,3,3,3,4}	Pentisteriruncinated 7-orthoplex (Tecpaz)	(0,1,2,3,3,3,4)√2						241920	53760
77	t_{1,2,3,5}{4,3,3,3,3,3}	Bistericantitruncated 7-cube (Becgresa)	(0,1,2,3,3,4,4)√2						362880	80640
78	t_{1,2,3,4}{4,3,3,3,3,3}	Biruncicantitruncated 7-cube (Gibposa)	(0,1,2,3,4,4,4)√2						188160	53760
79	t_{0,1,2,6}{3,3,3,3,3,4}	Hexicantitruncated 7-orthoplex (Pugarez)	(0,0,0,0,1,2,3)√2 + (1,1,1,1,1,1,1)						134400	26880
80	t_{0,1,3,6}{3,3,3,3,3,4}	Hexiruncitruncated 7-orthoplex (Papataz)	(0,0,0,1,1,2,3)√2 + (1,1,1,1,1,1,1)						322560	53760
81	t_{0,2,3,6}{3,3,3,3,3,4}	Hexiruncicantellated 7-orthoplex (Puparez)	(0,0,0,1,2,2,3)√2 + (1,1,1,1,1,1,1)						268800	53760
82	t_{0,3,4,5}{4,3,3,3,3,3}	Pentisteriruncinated 7-cube (Tecpasa)	(0,0,0,1,2,3,3)√2 + (1,1,1,1,1,1,1)						241920	53760
83	t_{0,1,4,6}{3,3,3,3,3,4}	Hexisteritruncated 7-orthoplex (Pucotaz)	(0,0,1,1,1,2,3)√2 + (1,1,1,1,1,1,1)						322560	53760
84	t_{0,2,4,6}{4,3,3,3,3,3}	Hexistericantellated 7-cube (Pucrosaz)	(0,0,1,1,2,2,3)√2 + (1,1,1,1,1,1,1)						483840	80640
85	t_{0,2,4,5}{4,3,3,3,3,3}	Pentistericantellated 7-cube (Tecresa)	(0,0,1,1,2,3,3)√2 + (1,1,1,1,1,1,1)						403200	80640
86	t_{0,2,3,6}{4,3,3,3,3,3}	Hexiruncicantellated 7-cube (Pupresa)	(0,0,1,2,2,2,3)√2 + (1,1,1,1,1,1,1)						268800	53760
87	t_{0,2,3,5}{4,3,3,3,3,3}	Pentiruncicantellated 7-cube (Topresa)	(0,0,1,2,2,3,3)√2 + (1,1,1,1,1,1,1)						403200	80640
88	t_{0,2,3,4}{4,3,3,3,3,3}	Steriruncicantellated 7-cube (Copresa)	(0,0,1,2,3,3,3)√2 + (1,1,1,1,1,1,1)						215040	53760
89	t_{0,1,5,6}{4,3,3,3,3,3}	Hexipentitruncated 7-cube (Putatosez)	(0,1,1,1,1,2,3)√2 + (1,1,1,1,1,1,1)						134400	26880
90	t_{0,1,4,6}{4,3,3,3,3,3}	Hexisteritruncated 7-cube (Pacutsa)	(0,1,1,1,2,2,3)√2 + (1,1,1,1,1,1,1)						322560	53760
91	t_{0,1,4,5}{4,3,3,3,3,3}	Pentisteritruncated 7-cube (Tecatsa)	(0,1,1,1,2,3,3)√2 + (1,1,1,1,1,1,1)						241920	53760
92	t_{0,1,3,6}{4,3,3,3,3,3}	Hexiruncitruncated 7-cube (Pupetsa)	(0,1,1,2,2,2,3)√2 + (1,1,1,1,1,1,1)						322560	53760
93	t_{0,1,3,5}{4,3,3,3,3,3}	Pentiruncitruncated 7-cube (Toptosa)	(0,1,1,2,2,3,3)√2 + (1,1,1,1,1,1,1)						443520	80640
94	t_{0,1,3,4}{4,3,3,3,3,3}	Steriruncitruncated 7-cube (Captesa)	(0,1,1,2,3,3,3)√2 + (1,1,1,1,1,1,1)						215040	53760
95	t_{0,1,2,6}{4,3,3,3,3,3}	Hexicantitruncated 7-cube (Pugrosa)	(0,1,2,2,2,2,3)√2 + (1,1,1,1,1,1,1)						134400	26880
96	t_{0,1,2,5}{4,3,3,3,3,3}	Penticantitruncated 7-cube (Togresa)	(0,1,2,2,2,3,3)√2 + (1,1,1,1,1,1,1)						295680	53760
97	t_{0,1,2,4}{4,3,3,3,3,3}	Stericantitruncated 7-cube (Cogarsa)	(0,1,2,2,3,3,3)√2 + (1,1,1,1,1,1,1)						268800	53760
98	t_{0,1,2,3}{4,3,3,3,3,3}	Runcicantitruncated 7-cube (Gapsa)	(0,1,2,3,3,3,3)√2 + (1,1,1,1,1,1,1)						94080	26880
99	t_{0,1,2,3,4}{3,3,3,3,3,4}	Steriruncicantitruncated 7-orthoplex (Gocaz)	(0,0,1,2,3,4,5)√2						322560	80640
100	t_{0,1,2,3,5}{3,3,3,3,3,4}	Pentiruncicantitruncated 7-orthoplex (Tegopaz)	(0,1,1,2,3,4,5)√2						725760	161280
101	t_{0,1,2,4,5}{3,3,3,3,3,4}	Pentistericantitruncated 7-orthoplex (Tecagraz)	(0,1,2,2,3,4,5)√2						645120	161280
102	t_{0,1,3,4,5}{3,3,3,3,3,4}	Pentisteriruncitruncated 7-orthoplex (Tecpotaz)	(0,1,2,3,3,4,5)√2						645120	161280
103	t_{0,2,3,4,5}{3,3,3,3,3,4}	Pentisteriruncicantellated 7-orthoplex (Tacparez)	(0,1,2,3,4,4,5)√2						645120	161280
104	t_{1,2,3,4,5}{4,3,3,3,3,3}	Bisteriruncicantitruncated 7-cube (Gabcosaz)	(0,1,2,3,4,5,5)√2						564480	161280
105	t_{0,1,2,3,6}{3,3,3,3,3,4}	Hexiruncicantitruncated 7-orthoplex (Pugopaz)	(0,0,0,1,2,3,4)√2 + (1,1,1,1,1,1,1)						483840	107520
106	t_{0,1,2,4,6}{3,3,3,3,3,4}	Hexistericantitruncated 7-orthoplex (Pucagraz)	(0,0,1,1,2,3,4)√2 + (1,1,1,1,1,1,1)						806400	161280
107	t_{0,1,3,4,6}{3,3,3,3,3,4}	Hexisteriruncitruncated 7-orthoplex (Pucpotaz)	(0,0,1,2,2,3,4)√2 + (1,1,1,1,1,1,1)						725760	161280
108	t_{0,2,3,4,6}{4,3,3,3,3,3}	Hexisteriruncicantellated 7-cube (Pucprosaz)	(0,0,1,2,3,3,4)√2 + (1,1,1,1,1,1,1)						725760	161280
109	t_{0,2,3,4,5}{4,3,3,3,3,3}	Pentisteriruncicantellated 7-cube (Tocpresa)	(0,0,1,2,3,4,4)√2 + (1,1,1,1,1,1,1)						645120	161280
110	t_{0,1,2,5,6}{3,3,3,3,3,4}	Hexipenticantitruncated 7-orthoplex (Putegraz)	(0,1,1,1,2,3,4)√2 + (1,1,1,1,1,1,1)						483840	107520
111	t_{0,1,3,5,6}{4,3,3,3,3,3}	Hexipentiruncitruncated 7-cube (Putpetsaz)	(0,1,1,2,2,3,4)√2 + (1,1,1,1,1,1,1)						806400	161280
112	t_{0,1,3,4,6}{4,3,3,3,3,3}	Hexisteriruncitruncated 7-cube (Pucpetsa)	(0,1,1,2,3,3,4)√2 + (1,1,1,1,1,1,1)						725760	161280
113	t_{0,1,3,4,5}{4,3,3,3,3,3}	Pentisteriruncitruncated 7-cube (Tecpetsa)	(0,1,1,2,3,4,4)√2 + (1,1,1,1,1,1,1)						645120	161280
114	t_{0,1,2,5,6}{4,3,3,3,3,3}	Hexipenticantitruncated 7-cube (Putgresa)	(0,1,2,2,2,3,4)√2 + (1,1,1,1,1,1,1)						483840	107520
115	t_{0,1,2,4,6}{4,3,3,3,3,3}	Hexistericantitruncated 7-cube (Pucagrosa)	(0,1,2,2,3,3,4)√2 + (1,1,1,1,1,1,1)						806400	161280
116	t_{0,1,2,4,5}{4,3,3,3,3,3}	Pentistericantitruncated 7-cube (Tecgresa)	(0,1,2,2,3,4,4)√2 + (1,1,1,1,1,1,1)						645120	161280
117	t_{0,1,2,3,6}{4,3,3,3,3,3}	Hexiruncicantitruncated 7-cube (Pugopsa)	(0,1,2,3,3,3,4)√2 + (1,1,1,1,1,1,1)						483840	107520
118	t_{0,1,2,3,5}{4,3,3,3,3,3}	Pentiruncicantitruncated 7-cube (Togapsa)	(0,1,2,3,3,4,4)√2 + (1,1,1,1,1,1,1)						725760	161280
119	t_{0,1,2,3,4}{4,3,3,3,3,3}	Steriruncicantitruncated 7-cube (Gacosa)	(0,1,2,3,4,4,4)√2 + (1,1,1,1,1,1,1)						376320	107520
120	t_{0,1,2,3,4,5}{3,3,3,3,3,4}	Pentisteriruncicantitruncated 7-orthoplex (Gotaz)	(0,1,2,3,4,5,6)√2						1128960	322560
121	t_{0,1,2,3,4,6}{3,3,3,3,3,4}	Hexisteriruncicantitruncated 7-orthoplex (Pugacaz)	(0,0,1,2,3,4,5)√2 + (1,1,1,1,1,1,1)						1290240	322560
122	t_{0,1,2,3,5,6}{3,3,3,3,3,4}	Hexipentiruncicantitruncated 7-orthoplex (Putgapaz)	(0,1,1,2,3,4,5)√2 + (1,1,1,1,1,1,1)						1290240	322560
123	t_{0,1,2,4,5,6}{4,3,3,3,3,3}	Hexipentistericantitruncated 7-cube (Putcagrasaz)	(0,1,2,2,3,4,5)√2 + (1,1,1,1,1,1,1)						1290240	322560
124	t_{0,1,2,3,5,6}{4,3,3,3,3,3}	Hexipentiruncicantitruncated 7-cube (Putgapsa)	(0,1,2,3,3,4,5)√2 + (1,1,1,1,1,1,1)						1290240	322560
125	t_{0,1,2,3,4,6}{4,3,3,3,3,3}	Hexisteriruncicantitruncated 7-cube (Pugacasa)	(0,1,2,3,4,4,5)√2 + (1,1,1,1,1,1,1)						1290240	322560
126	t_{0,1,2,3,4,5}{4,3,3,3,3,3}	Pentisteriruncicantitruncated 7-cube (Gotesa)	(0,1,2,3,4,5,5)√2 + (1,1,1,1,1,1,1)						1128960	322560
127	t_{0,1,2,3,4,5,6}{4,3,3,3,3,3}	Omnitruncated 7-cube (Guposaz)	(0,1,2,3,4,5,6)√2 + (1,1,1,1,1,1,1)						2257920	645120

== The D_{7} family ==
The D_{7} family has symmetry of order 322560 (7 factorial × 2^{6}).

This family has 3 × 32 − 1 = 95 Wythoffian uniform polytopes, generated by marking one or more nodes of the D_{7} Coxeter-Dynkin diagram. Of these, 63 (2 × 32 − 1) are repeated from the B_{7} family and 32 are unique to this family, listed below. Bowers names and acronym are given for cross-referencing.

See also list of D7 polytopes for Coxeter plane graphs of these polytopes.

D_{7} uniform polytopes
#	Coxeter diagram	Names	Base point (Alternately signed)	Element counts						
#	Coxeter diagram	Names	Base point (Alternately signed)	6	5	4	3	2	1	0
1	=	7-cube demihepteract (hesa)	(1,1,1,1,1,1,1)	78	532	1624	2800	2240	672	64
2	=	cantic 7-cube truncated demihepteract (thesa)	(1,1,3,3,3,3,3)	142	1428	5656	11760	13440	7392	1344
3	=	runcic 7-cube small rhombated demihepteract (sirhesa)	(1,1,1,3,3,3,3)						16800	2240
4	=	steric 7-cube small prismated demihepteract (sphosa)	(1,1,1,1,3,3,3)						20160	2240
5	=	pentic 7-cube small cellated demihepteract (sochesa)	(1,1,1,1,1,3,3)						13440	1344
6	=	hexic 7-cube small terated demihepteract (suthesa)	(1,1,1,1,1,1,3)						4704	448
7	=	runcicantic 7-cube great rhombated demihepteract (girhesa)	(1,1,3,5,5,5,5)						23520	6720
8	=	stericantic 7-cube prismatotruncated demihepteract (pothesa)	(1,1,3,3,5,5,5)						73920	13440
9	=	steriruncic 7-cube prismatorhomated demihepteract (prohesa)	(1,1,1,3,5,5,5)						40320	8960
10	=	penticantic 7-cube cellitruncated demihepteract (cothesa)	(1,1,3,3,3,5,5)						87360	13440
11	=	pentiruncic 7-cube cellirhombated demihepteract (crohesa)	(1,1,1,3,3,5,5)						87360	13440
12	=	pentisteric 7-cube celliprismated demihepteract (caphesa)	(1,1,1,1,3,5,5)						40320	6720
13	=	hexicantic 7-cube tericantic demihepteract (tuthesa)	(1,1,3,3,3,3,5)						43680	6720
14	=	hexiruncic 7-cube terirhombated demihepteract (turhesa)	(1,1,1,3,3,3,5)						67200	8960
15	=	hexisteric 7-cube teriprismated demihepteract (tuphesa)	(1,1,1,1,3,3,5)						53760	6720
16	=	hexipentic 7-cube tericellated demihepteract (tuchesa)	(1,1,1,1,1,3,5)						21504	2688
17	=	steriruncicantic 7-cube great prismated demihepteract (gephosa)	(1,1,3,5,7,7,7)						94080	26880
18	=	pentiruncicantic 7-cube celligreatorhombated demihepteract (cagrohesa)	(1,1,3,5,5,7,7)						181440	40320
19	=	pentistericantic 7-cube celliprismatotruncated demihepteract (capthesa)	(1,1,3,3,5,7,7)						181440	40320
20	=	pentisteriruncic 7-cube celliprismatorhombated demihepteract (coprahesa)	(1,1,1,3,5,7,7)						120960	26880
21	=	hexiruncicantic 7-cube terigreatorhombated demihepteract (tugrohesa)	(1,1,3,5,5,5,7)						120960	26880
22	=	hexistericantic 7-cube teriprismatotruncated demihepteract (tupthesa)	(1,1,3,3,5,5,7)						221760	40320
23	=	hexisteriruncic 7-cube teriprismatorhombated demihepteract (tuprohesa)	(1,1,1,3,5,5,7)						134400	26880
24	=	hexipenticantic 7-cube tericellitruncated demihepteract (tucothesa)	(1,1,3,3,3,5,7)						147840	26880
25	=	hexipentiruncic 7-cube tericellirhombated demihepteract (tucrohesa)	(1,1,1,3,3,5,7)						161280	26880
26	=	hexipentisteric 7-cube tericelliprismated demihepteract (tucophesa)	(1,1,1,1,3,5,7)						80640	13440
27	=	pentisteriruncicantic 7-cube great cellated demihepteract (gochesa)	(1,1,3,5,7,9,9)						282240	80640
28	=	hexisteriruncicantic 7-cube terigreatoprismated demihepteract (tugphesa)	(1,1,3,5,7,7,9)						322560	80640
29	=	hexipentiruncicantic 7-cube tericelligreatorhombated demihepteract (tucagrohesa)	(1,1,3,5,5,7,9)						322560	80640
30	=	hexipentistericantic 7-cube tericelliprismatotruncated demihepteract (tucpathesa)	(1,1,3,3,5,7,9)						362880	80640
31	=	hexipentisteriruncic 7-cube tericelliprismatorhombated demihepteract (tucprohesa)	(1,1,1,3,5,7,9)						241920	53760
32	=	hexipentisteriruncicantic 7-cube great terated demihepteract (guthesa)	(1,1,3,5,7,9,11)						564480	161280

== The E_{7} family ==
The E_{7} Coxeter group has order 2,903,040.

There are 127 forms based on all permutations of the Coxeter-Dynkin diagrams with one or more rings. Bowers names and acronym are given for cross-referencing.

See also a list of E7 polytopes for symmetric Coxeter plane graphs of these polytopes.

E_{7} uniform polytopes
#	Coxeter-Dynkin diagram	Names	Element counts						
#	Coxeter-Dynkin diagram	Names	6	5	4	3	2	1	0
1		2_{31} (laq)	632	4788	16128	20160	10080	2016	126
2		Rectified 2_{31} (rolaq)	758	10332	47880	100800	90720	30240	2016
3		Rectified 1_{32} (rolin)	758	12348	72072	191520	241920	120960	10080
4		1_{32} (lin)	182	4284	23688	50400	40320	10080	576
5		Birectified 3_{21} (branq)	758	12348	68040	161280	161280	60480	4032
6		Rectified 3_{21} (ranq)	758	44352	70560	48384	11592	12096	756
7		3_{21} (naq)	702	6048	12096	10080	4032	756	56
8		Truncated 2_{31} (talq)	758	10332	47880	100800	90720	32256	4032
9		Cantellated 2_{31} (sirlaq)						131040	20160
10		Bitruncated 2_{31} (botlaq)							30240
11		small demified 2_{31} (shilq)	2774	22428	78120	151200	131040	42336	4032
12		demirectified 2_{31} (hirlaq)							12096
13		truncated 1_{32} (tolin)							20160
14		small demiprismated 2_{31} (shiplaq)							20160
15		birectified 1_{32} (berlin)	758	22428	142632	403200	544320	302400	40320
16		tritruncated 3_{21} (totanq)							40320
17		demibirectified 3_{21} (hobranq)							20160
18		small cellated 2_{31} (scalq)							7560
19		small biprismated 2_{31} (sobpalq)							30240
20		small birhombated 3_{21} (sabranq)							60480
21		demirectified 3_{21} (harnaq)							12096
22		bitruncated 3_{21} (botnaq)							12096
23		small terated 3_{21} (stanq)							1512
24		small demicellated 3_{21} (shocanq)							12096
25		small prismated 3_{21} (spanq)							40320
26		small demified 3_{21} (shanq)							4032
27		small rhombated 3_{21} (sranq)							12096
28		Truncated 3_{21} (tanq)	758	11592	48384	70560	44352	12852	1512
29		great rhombated 2_{31} (girlaq)							60480
30		demitruncated 2_{31} (hotlaq)							24192
31		small demirhombated 2_{31} (sherlaq)							60480
32		demibitruncated 2_{31} (hobtalq)							60480
33		demiprismated 2_{31} (hiptalq)							80640
34		demiprismatorhombated 2_{31} (hiprolaq)							120960
35		bitruncated 1_{32} (batlin)							120960
36		small prismated 2_{31} (spalq)							80640
37		small rhombated 1_{32} (sirlin)							120960
38		tritruncated 2_{31} (tatilq)							80640
39		cellitruncated 2_{31} (catalaq)							60480
40		cellirhombated 2_{31} (crilq)							362880
41		biprismatotruncated 2_{31} (biptalq)							181440
42		small prismated 1_{32} (seplin)							60480
43		small biprismated 3_{21} (sabipnaq)							120960
44		small demibirhombated 3_{21} (shobranq)							120960
45		cellidemiprismated 2_{31} (chaplaq)							60480
46		demibiprismatotruncated 3_{21} (hobpotanq)							120960
47		great birhombated 3_{21} (gobranq)							120960
48		demibitruncated 3_{21} (hobtanq)							60480
49		teritruncated 2_{31} (totalq)							24192
50		terirhombated 2_{31} (trilq)							120960
51		demicelliprismated 3_{21} (hicpanq)							120960
52		small teridemified 2_{31} (sethalq)							24192
53		small cellated 3_{21} (scanq)							60480
54		demiprismated 3_{21} (hipnaq)							80640
55		terirhombated 3_{21} (tranq)							60480
56		demicellirhombated 3_{21} (hocranq)							120960
57		prismatorhombated 3_{21} (pranq)							120960
58		small demirhombated 3_{21} (sharnaq)							60480
59		teritruncated 3_{21} (tetanq)							15120
60		demicellitruncated 3_{21} (hictanq)							60480
61		prismatotruncated 3_{21} (potanq)							120960
62		demitruncated 3_{21} (hotnaq)							24192
63		great rhombated 3_{21} (granq)							24192
64		great demified 2_{31} (gahlaq)							120960
65		great demiprismated 2_{31} (gahplaq)							241920
66		prismatotruncated 2_{31} (potlaq)							241920
67		prismatorhombated 2_{31} (prolaq)							241920
68		great rhombated 1_{32} (girlin)							241920
69		celligreatorhombated 2_{31} (cagrilq)							362880
70		cellidemitruncated 2_{31} (chotalq)							241920
71		prismatotruncated 1_{32} (patlin)							362880
72		biprismatorhombated 3_{21} (bipirnaq)							362880
73		tritruncated 1_{32} (tatlin)							241920
74		cellidemiprismatorhombated 2_{31} (chopralq)							362880
75		great demibiprismated 3_{21} (ghobipnaq)							362880
76		celliprismated 2_{31} (caplaq)							241920
77		biprismatotruncated 3_{21} (boptanq)							362880
78		great trirhombated 2_{31} (gatralaq)							241920
79		terigreatorhombated 2_{31} (togrilq)							241920
80		teridemitruncated 2_{31} (thotalq)							120960
81		teridemirhombated 2_{31} (thorlaq)							241920
82		celliprismated 3_{21} (capnaq)							241920
83		teridemiprismatotruncated 2_{31} (thoptalq)							241920
84		teriprismatorhombated 3_{21} (tapronaq)							362880
85		demicelliprismatorhombated 3_{21} (hacpranq)							362880
86		teriprismated 2_{31} (toplaq)							241920
87		cellirhombated 3_{21} (cranq)							362880
88		demiprismatorhombated 3_{21} (hapranq)							241920
89		tericellitruncated 2_{31} (tectalq)							120960
90		teriprismatotruncated 3_{21} (toptanq)							362880
91		demicelliprismatotruncated 3_{21} (hecpotanq)							362880
92		teridemitruncated 3_{21} (thotanq)							120960
93		cellitruncated 3_{21} (catnaq)							241920
94		demiprismatotruncated 3_{21} (hiptanq)							241920
95		terigreatorhombated 3_{21} (tagranq)							120960
96		demicelligreatorhombated 3_{21} (hicgarnq)							241920
97		great prismated 3_{21} (gopanq)							241920
98		great demirhombated 3_{21} (gahranq)							120960
99		great prismated 2_{31} (gopalq)							483840
100		great cellidemified 2_{31} (gechalq)							725760
101		great birhombated 1_{32} (gebrolin)							725760
102		prismatorhombated 1_{32} (prolin)							725760
103		celliprismatorhombated 2_{31} (caprolaq)							725760
104		great biprismated 2_{31} (gobpalq)							725760
105		tericelliprismated 3_{21} (ticpanq)							483840
106		teridemigreatoprismated 2_{31} (thegpalq)							725760
107		teriprismatotruncated 2_{31} (teptalq)							725760
108		teriprismatorhombated 2_{31} (topralq)							725760
109		cellipriemsatorhombated 3_{21} (copranq)							725760
110		tericelligreatorhombated 2_{31} (tecgrolaq)							725760
111		tericellitruncated 3_{21} (tectanq)							483840
112		teridemiprismatotruncated 3_{21} (thoptanq)							725760
113		celliprismatotruncated 3_{21} (coptanq)							725760
114		teridemicelligreatorhombated 3_{21} (thocgranq)							483840
115		terigreatoprismated 3_{21} (tagpanq)							725760
116		great demicellated 3_{21} (gahcnaq)							725760
117		tericelliprismated laq (tecpalq)							483840
118		celligreatorhombated 3_{21} (cogranq)							725760
119		great demified 3_{21} (gahnq)							483840
120		great cellated 2_{31} (gocalq)							1451520
121		terigreatoprismated 2_{31} (tegpalq)							1451520
122		tericelliprismatotruncated 3_{21} (tecpotniq)							1451520
123		tericellidemigreatoprismated 2_{31} (techogaplaq)							1451520
124		tericelligreatorhombated 3_{21} (tacgarnq)							1451520
125		tericelliprismatorhombated 2_{31} (tecprolaq)							1451520
126		great cellated 3_{21} (gocanq)							1451520
127		great terated 3_{21} (gotanq)							2903040

== Regular and uniform honeycombs ==
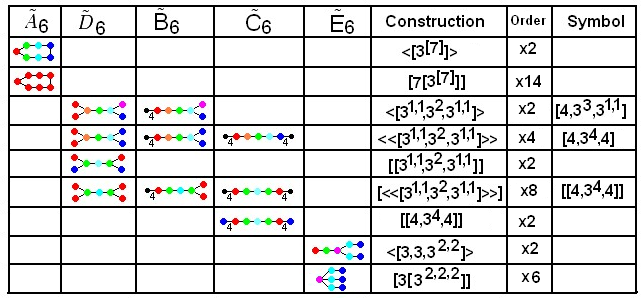
Coxeter-Dynkin diagram correspondences between families and higher symmetry within diagrams. Nodes of the same color in each row represent identical mirrors. Black nodes are not active in the correspondence.

There are five fundamental affine Coxeter groups and sixteen prismatic groups that generate regular and uniform tessellations in 6-space:

#	Coxeter group		Coxeter diagram	Forms
1	${\tilde{A}}_6$	[3^{[7]}]		17
2	${\tilde{C}}_6$	[4,3^{4},4]		71
3	${\tilde{B}}_6$	h[4,3^{4},4] [4,3^{3},3^{1,1}]		95 (32 new)
4	${\tilde{D}}_6$	q[4,3^{4},4] [3^{1,1},3^{2},3^{1,1}]		41 (6 new)
5	${\tilde{E}}_6$	[3^{2,2,2}]		39

Regular and uniform tessellations include:

- ${\tilde{A}}_6$, 17 forms
  - Uniform 6-simplex honeycomb: {3^{[7]}}
  - Uniform Cyclotruncated 6-simplex honeycomb: t_{0,1}{3^{[7]}}
  - Uniform Omnitruncated 6-simplex honeycomb: t_{0,1,2,3,4,5,6,7}{3^{[7]}}
- ${\tilde{C}}_6$, [4,3^{4},4], 71 forms
  - Regular 6-cube honeycomb, represented by symbols {4,3^{4},4},
- ${\tilde{B}}_6$, [3^{1,1},3^{3},4], 95 forms, 64 shared with ${\tilde{C}}_6$, 32 new
  - Uniform 6-demicube honeycomb, represented by symbols h{4,3^{4},4} = {3^{1,1},3^{3},4}, =
- ${\tilde{D}}_6$, [3^{1,1},3^{2},3^{1,1}], 41 unique ringed permutations, most shared with ${\tilde{B}}_6$ and ${\tilde{C}}_6$, and 6 are new. Coxeter calls the first one a quarter 6-cubic honeycomb.
  - =
  - =
  - =
  - =
  - =
  - =
- ${\tilde{E}}_6$: [3^{2,2,2}], 39 forms
  - Uniform 2_{22} honeycomb: represented by symbols {3,3,3^{2,2}},
  - Uniform t_{4}(2_{22}) honeycomb: 4r{3,3,3^{2,2}},
  - Uniform 0_{222} honeycomb: {3^{2,2,2}},
  - Uniform t_{2}(0_{222}) honeycomb: 2r{3^{2,2,2}},

Prismatic groups
#	Coxeter group		Coxeter-Dynkin diagram
1	${\tilde{A}}_5$x${\tilde{I}}_1$	[3^{[6]},2,∞]	
2	${\tilde{B}}_5$x${\tilde{I}}_1$	[4,3,3^{1,1},2,∞]	
3	${\tilde{C}}_5$x${\tilde{I}}_1$	[4,3^{3},4,2,∞]	
4	${\tilde{D}}_5$x${\tilde{I}}_1$	[3^{1,1},3,3^{1,1},2,∞]	
5	${\tilde{A}}_4$x${\tilde{I}}_1$x${\tilde{I}}_1$	[3^{[5]},2,∞,2,∞,2,∞]	
6	${\tilde{B}}_4$x${\tilde{I}}_1$x${\tilde{I}}_1$	[4,3,3^{1,1},2,∞,2,∞]	
7	${\tilde{C}}_4$x${\tilde{I}}_1$x${\tilde{I}}_1$	[4,3,3,4,2,∞,2,∞]	
8	${\tilde{D}}_4$x${\tilde{I}}_1$x${\tilde{I}}_1$	[3^{1,1,1,1},2,∞,2,∞]	
9	${\tilde{F}}_4$x${\tilde{I}}_1$x${\tilde{I}}_1$	[3,4,3,3,2,∞,2,∞]	
10	${\tilde{C}}_3$x${\tilde{I}}_1$x${\tilde{I}}_1$x${\tilde{I}}_1$	[4,3,4,2,∞,2,∞,2,∞]	
11	${\tilde{B}}_3$x${\tilde{I}}_1$x${\tilde{I}}_1$x${\tilde{I}}_1$	[4,3^{1,1},2,∞,2,∞,2,∞]	
12	${\tilde{A}}_3$x${\tilde{I}}_1$x${\tilde{I}}_1$x${\tilde{I}}_1$	[3^{[4]},2,∞,2,∞,2,∞]	
13	${\tilde{C}}_2$x${\tilde{I}}_1$x${\tilde{I}}_1$x${\tilde{I}}_1$x${\tilde{I}}_1$	[4,4,2,∞,2,∞,2,∞,2,∞]	
14	${\tilde{H}}_2$x${\tilde{I}}_1$x${\tilde{I}}_1$x${\tilde{I}}_1$x${\tilde{I}}_1$	[6,3,2,∞,2,∞,2,∞,2,∞]	
15	${\tilde{A}}_2$x${\tilde{I}}_1$x${\tilde{I}}_1$x${\tilde{I}}_1$x${\tilde{I}}_1$	[3^{[3]},2,∞,2,∞,2,∞,2,∞]	
16	${\tilde{I}}_1$x${\tilde{I}}_1$x${\tilde{I}}_1$x${\tilde{I}}_1$x${\tilde{I}}_1$x${\tilde{I}}_1$	[∞,2,∞,2,∞,2,∞,2,∞]	

=== Regular and uniform hyperbolic honeycombs ===
There are no compact hyperbolic Coxeter groups of rank 7, groups that can generate honeycombs with all finite facets, and a finite vertex figure. However, there are 3 paracompact hyperbolic Coxeter groups of rank 7, each generating uniform honeycombs in 6-space as permutations of rings of the Coxeter diagrams.

${\bar{P}}_6$ = [3,3^{[6]}]:	${\bar{Q}}_6$ = [3^{1,1},3,3^{2,1}]:	${\bar{S}}_6$ = [4,3,3,3^{2,1}]:

== Notes on the Wythoff construction for the uniform 7-polytopes ==
The reflective 7-dimensional uniform polytopes are constructed through a Wythoff construction process, and represented by a Coxeter-Dynkin diagram, where each node represents a mirror. An active mirror is represented by a ringed node. Each combination of active mirrors generates a unique uniform polytope. Uniform polytopes are named in relation to the regular polytopes in each family. Some families have two regular constructors and thus may be named in two equally valid ways.

Here are the primary operators available for constructing and naming the uniform 7-polytopes.

The prismatic forms and bifurcating graphs can use the same truncation indexing notation, but require an explicit numbering system on the nodes for clarity.

Operation	Extended Schläfli symbol	Coxeter- Dynkin diagram	Description
Parent	t_{0}{p,q,r,s,t,u}		Any regular 7-polytope
Rectified	t_{1}{p,q,r,s,t,u}		The edges are fully truncated into single points. The 7-polytope now has the combined faces of the parent and dual.
Birectified	t_{2}{p,q,r,s,t,u}		Birectification reduces cells to their duals.
Truncated	t_{0,1}{p,q,r,s,t,u}		Each original vertex is cut off, with a new face filling the gap. Truncation has a degree of freedom, which has one solution that creates a uniform truncated 7-polytope. The 7-polytope has its original faces doubled in sides, and contains the faces of the dual.
Bitruncated	t_{1,2}{p,q,r,s,t,u}		Bitrunction transforms cells to their dual truncation.
Tritruncated	t_{2,3}{p,q,r,s,t,u}		Tritruncation transforms 4-faces to their dual truncation.
Cantellated	t_{0,2}{p,q,r,s,t,u}		In addition to vertex truncation, each original edge is beveled with new rectangular faces appearing in their place. A uniform cantellation is halfway between both the parent and dual forms.
Bicantellated	t_{1,3}{p,q,r,s,t,u}		In addition to vertex truncation, each original edge is beveled with new rectangular faces appearing in their place. A uniform cantellation is halfway between both the parent and dual forms.
Runcinated	t_{0,3}{p,q,r,s,t,u}		Runcination reduces cells and creates new cells at the vertices and edges.
Biruncinated	t_{1,4}{p,q,r,s,t,u}		Runcination reduces cells and creates new cells at the vertices and edges.
Stericated	t_{0,4}{p,q,r,s,t,u}		Sterication reduces 4-faces and creates new 4-faces at the vertices, edges, and faces in the gaps.
Pentellated	t_{0,5}{p,q,r,s,t,u}		Pentellation reduces 5-faces and creates new 5-faces at the vertices, edges, faces, and cells in the gaps.
Hexicated	t_{0,6}{p,q,r,s,t,u}		Hexication reduces 6-faces and creates new 6-faces at the vertices, edges, faces, cells, and 4-faces in the gaps. (expansion operation for 7-polytopes)
Omnitruncated	t_{0,1,2,3,4,5,6}{p,q,r,s,t,u}		All six operators, truncation, cantellation, runcination, sterication, pentellation, and hexication are applied.

Fundamental convex regular and uniform polytopes in dimensions 2–10
Family	A_{n}	B_{n}	I_{2}(p) / D_{n}	E_{6} / E_{7} / E_{8} / F_{4} / G_{2}	H_{n}
Regular polygon	Triangle	Square	p-gon	Hexagon	Pentagon
Uniform polyhedron	Tetrahedron	Octahedron • Cube	Demicube		Dodecahedron • Icosahedron
Uniform polychoron	Pentachoron	16-cell • Tesseract	Demitesseract	24-cell	120-cell • 600-cell
Uniform 5-polytope	5-simplex	5-orthoplex • 5-cube	5-demicube		
Uniform 6-polytope	6-simplex	6-orthoplex • 6-cube	6-demicube	1_{22} • 2_{21}	
Uniform 7-polytope	7-simplex	7-orthoplex • 7-cube	7-demicube	1_{32} • 2_{31} • 3_{21}	
Uniform 8-polytope	8-simplex	8-orthoplex • 8-cube	8-demicube	1_{42} • 2_{41} • 4_{21}	
Uniform 9-polytope	9-simplex	9-orthoplex • 9-cube	9-demicube		
Uniform 10-polytope	10-simplex	10-orthoplex • 10-cube	10-demicube		
Uniform n-polytope	n-simplex	n-orthoplex • n-cube	n-demicube	1_{k2} • 2_{k1} • k_{21}	n-pentagonal polytope
Topics: Polytope families • Regular polytope • List of regular polytopes and compounds • Polytope operations
