= 3 21 polytope =

Uniform 7-dimensional polytope

3_{21}	2_{31}	1_{32}
Rectified 3_{21}		Birectified 3_{21}
Rectified 2_{31}		Rectified 1_{32}
Orthogonal projections in E_{7} Coxeter plane

In 7-dimensional geometry, the 3_{21} polytope is a uniform 7-polytope, constructed within the symmetry of the E_{7} group. It was discovered by Thorold Gosset, published in his 1900 paper. He called it a 7-ic semi-regular figure.

Its Coxeter symbol is 3_{21}, describing its bifurcating Coxeter-Dynkin diagram, with a single ring on the end of one of the 3-node sequences.

The rectified 3_{21} is constructed by points at the mid-edges of the 3_{21}. The birectified 3_{21} is constructed by points at the triangle face centers of the 3_{21}. The trirectified 3_{21} is constructed by points at the tetrahedral centers of the 3_{21}, and is the same as the rectified 1_{32}.

These polytopes are part of a family of 127 (2^{7}−1) convex uniform polytopes in 7 dimensions, made of uniform 6-polytope facets and vertex figures, defined by all permutations of rings in this Coxeter-Dynkin diagram:.

== 3_{21} polytope ==
3_{21} polytope
Type	Uniform 7-polytope
Family	k_{21} polytope
Schläfli symbol	{3,3,3,3^{2,1}}
Coxeter symbol	3_{21}
Coxeter diagram	
6-faces	702 total: 126 3_{11} 576 {3^{5}}
5-faces	6048: 4032 {3^{4}} 2016 {3^{4}}
4-faces	12096 {3^{3}}
Cells	10080 {3,3}
Faces	4032 {3}
Edges	756
Vertices	56
Vertex figure	2_{21} polytope
Petrie polygon	octadecagon
Coxeter group	E_{7}, [3^{3,2,1}], order 2903040
Properties	convex

In 7-dimensional geometry, the 3_{21} polytope is a uniform polytope. It has 56 vertices, and 702 facets: 126 3_{11} and 576 6-simplexes.

For visualization this 7-dimensional polytope is often displayed in a special skewed orthographic projection direction that fits its 56 vertices within an 18-gonal regular polygon (called a Petrie polygon). Its 756 edges are drawn between 3 rings of 18 vertices, and 2 vertices in the center. Specific higher elements (faces, cells, etc.) can also be extracted and drawn on this projection.

The 1-skeleton of the 3_{21} polytope is the Gosset graph.

This polytope, along with the 7-simplex, can tessellate 7-dimensional space, represented by 3_{31} and Coxeter-Dynkin diagram:.

=== Alternate names ===
- It is also called the Hess polytope for Edmund Hess who first discovered it.
- It was enumerated by Thorold Gosset in his 1900 paper. He called it a 7-ic semi-regular figure.
- E. L. Elte named it V_{56} (for its 56 vertices) in his 1912 listing of semiregular polytopes.
- H.S.M. Coxeter called it 3_{21} due to its bifurcating Coxeter-Dynkin diagram, having 3 branches of length 3, 2, and 1, and having a single ring on the final node of the 3 branch.
- Hecatonicosihexa-pentacosiheptacontahexa-exon (acronym: naq) - 126-576 facetted polyexon (Jonathan Bowers)

=== Coordinates ===
The 56 vertices can be most simply represented in 8-dimensional space, obtained by the 28 permutations of the coordinates and their opposite:

± (−3, −3, 1, 1, 1, 1, 1, 1)

=== Construction ===
Its construction is based on the E7 group. Coxeter named it as 3_{21} by its bifurcating Coxeter-Dynkin diagram, with a single ring on the end of the 3-node sequence.

The facet information can be extracted from its Coxeter-Dynkin diagram,.

Removing the node on the short branch leaves the 6-simplex,.

Removing the node on the end of the 2-length branch leaves the 6-orthoplex in its alternated form: 3_{11},.

Every simplex facet touches a 6-orthoplex facet, while alternate facets of the orthoplex touch either a simplex or another orthoplex.

The vertex figure is determined by removing the ringed node and ringing the neighboring node. This makes 2_{21} polytope,.

Seen in a configuration matrix, the element counts can be derived by mirror removal and ratios of Coxeter group orders.

E_{7}	k-face	f_{k}	f_{0}	f_{1}	f_{2}	f_{3}	f_{4}	f_{5}		f_{6}		k-figures	Notes
E_{6}	( )	f_{0}	56	27	216	720	1080	432	216	72	27	2_{21}	E_{7}/E_{6} = 72·8!/72/6! = 56
D_{5}A_{1}	{ }	f_{1}	2	756	16	80	160	80	40	16	10	5-demicube	E_{7}/D_{5}A_{1} = 72·8!/16/5!/2 = 756
A_{4}A_{2}	{3}	f_{2}	3	3	4032	10	30	20	10	5	5	rectified 5-cell	E_{7}/A_{4}A_{2} = 72·8!/5!/2 = 4032
A_{3}A_{2}A_{1}	{3,3}	f_{3}	4	6	4	10080	6	6	3	2	3	triangular prism	E_{7}/A_{3}A_{2}A_{1} = 72·8!/4!/3!/2 = 10080
A_{4}A_{1}	{3,3,3}	f_{4}	5	10	10	5	12096	2	1	1	2	isosceles triangle	E_{7}/A_{4}A_{1} = 72·8!/5!/2 = 12096
A_{5}A_{1}	{3,3,3,3}	f_{5}	6	15	20	15	6	4032	*	1	1	{ }	E_{7}/A_{5}A_{1} = 72·8!/6!/2 = 4032
A_{5}	{3,3,3,3}	f_{5}	6	15	20	15	6	*	2016	0	2	{ }	E_{7}/A_{5} = 72·8!/6! = 2016
A_{6}	{3,3,3,3,3}	f_{6}	7	21	35	35	21	10	0	576	*	( )	E_{7}/A_{6} = 72·8!/7! = 576
D_{6}	{3,3,3,3,4}	f_{6}	12	60	160	240	192	32	32	*	126	( )	E_{7}/D_{6} = 72·8!/32/6! = 126

=== Images ===
Coxeter plane projections
E7	E6 / F4	B7 / A6
[18]	[12]	[7×2]
A5	D7 / B6	D6 / B5
[6]	[12/2]	[10]
D5 / B4 / A4	D4 / B3 / A2 / G2	D3 / B2 / A3
[8]	[6]	[4]

=== Related polytopes ===
The 3_{21} is fifth in a dimensional series of semiregular polytopes. Each progressive uniform polytope is constructed vertex figure of the previous polytope. Thorold Gosset identified this series in 1900 as containing all regular polytope facets, containing all simplexes and orthoplexes.

k_{21} figures in n dimensions
Space	Finite						Euclidean	Hyperbolic
E_{n}	3	4	5	6	7	8	9	10
Coxeter group	E_{3}=A_{2}A_{1}	E_{4}=A_{4}	E_{5}=D_{5}	E_{6}	E_{7}	E_{8}	E_{9} = ${\tilde{E}}_{8}$ = E_{8}^{+}	E_{10} = ${\bar{T}}_8$ = E_{8}^{++}
Coxeter diagram								
Symmetry	[3^{−1,2,1}]	[3^{0,2,1}]	[3^{1,2,1}]	[3^{2,2,1}]	[3^{3,2,1}]	[3^{4,2,1}]	[3^{5,2,1}]	[3^{6,2,1}]
Order	12	120	1,920	51,840	2,903,040	696,729,600	∞	
Graph							-	-
Name	−1_{21}	0_{21}	1_{21}	2_{21}	3_{21}	4_{21}	5_{21}	6_{21}

It is in a dimensional series of uniform polytopes and honeycombs, expressed by Coxeter as 3_{k1} series. (A degenerate 4-dimensional case exists as 3-sphere tiling, a tetrahedral hosohedron.)

3_{k1} dimensional figures
Space	Finite				Euclidean	Hyperbolic
n	4	5	6	7	8	9
Coxeter group	A_{3}A_{1}	A_{5}	D_{6}	E_{7}	${\tilde{E}}_{7}$=E_{7}^{+}	${\bar{T}}_8$=E_{7}^{++}
Coxeter diagram						
Symmetry	[3^{−1,3,1}]	[3^{0,3,1}]	[[3^{1,3,1}]] = [4,3,3,3,3]	[3^{2,3,1}]	[3^{3,3,1}]	[3^{4,3,1}]
Order	48	720	46,080	2,903,040	∞	
Graph					-	-
Name	3_{1,-1}	3_{10}	3_{11}	3_{21}	3_{31}	3_{41}

== Rectified 3_{21} polytope ==
Rectified 3_{21} polytope
Type	Uniform 7-polytope
Schläfli symbol	t_{1}{3,3,3,3^{2,1}}
Coxeter symbol	t_{1}(3_{21})
Coxeter diagram	
6-faces	56 {3,3,3^{2,1}} 576 {3^{4,1}} 126 r{3,3,3,3^{1,1}}
5-faces	4032 {3^{4}} 1512 {3,3,3^{1,1}} 4032 r{3^{4}} 2016 r{3^{4}}
4-faces	24192 {3^{3}} 12096 {3^{3}} 12096 {3^{2,1}}
Cells	60480 {3,3} 10080 {3,4}
Faces	40320 {3} 4032 {3}
Edges	12096 { }
Vertices	756
Vertex figure	5-demicube prism
Petrie polygon	octadecagon
Coxeter group	E_{7}, [3^{3,2,1}], order 2903040
Properties	convex

=== Alternate names ===
- Rectified hecatonicosihexa-pentacosiheptacontahexa-exon as a rectified 126-576 facetted polyexon (acronym: ranq) (Jonathan Bowers)

=== Construction ===
Its construction is based on the E7 group. Coxeter named it as 3_{21} by its bifurcating Coxeter-Dynkin diagram, with a single node on the end of the 3-node sequence.

The facet information can be extracted from its Coxeter-Dynkin diagram,.

Removing the node on the short branch leaves the 6-simplex,.

Removing the node on the end of the 2-length branch leaves the rectified 6-orthoplex in its alternated form: t_{1}3_{11},.

Removing the node on the end of the 3-length branch leaves the 2_{21},.

The vertex figure is determined by removing the ringed node and ringing the neighboring node. This makes 5-demicube prism,.

=== Images ===
Coxeter plane projections
E7	E6 / F4	B7 / A6
[18]	[12]	[7×2]
A5	D7 / B6	D6 / B5
[6]	[12/2]	[10]
D5 / B4 / A4	D4 / B3 / A2 / G2	D3 / B2 / A3
[8]	[6]	[4]

== Birectified 3_{21} polytope ==
Birectified 3_{21} polytope
Type	Uniform 7-polytope
Schläfli symbol	t_{2}{3,3,3,3^{2,1}}
Coxeter symbol	t_{2}(3_{21})
Coxeter diagram	
6-faces	56 t_{1}{3,3,3^{2,1}} 576 {3^{3,2}} 126 t_{2}{3^{4},4}
5-faces	756 {3,3^{2,1}} 4032 r{3^{4}} 1512 t_{1}{3,3,3,4} 4032 {3^{2,2}} 2016 {3^{2,2}}
4-faces	12096 {3,3,3} 7560 {3,3,4} 24192 {3^{2,1}} 12096 {3^{2,1}} 12096 {3^{2,1}}
Cells	60480 {3,3} 30240 {3,3} 10080 {3,3} 60480 {3,4}
Faces	120960 {3} 40320 {3}
Edges	60480 { }
Vertices	4032
Vertex figure	5-cell-triangle duoprism
Petrie polygon	octadecagon
Coxeter group	E_{7}, [3^{3,2,1}], order 2903040
Properties	convex

=== Alternate names ===
- Birectified hecatonicosihexa-pentacosiheptacontahexa-exon as a birectified 126-576 facetted polyexon (acronym: branq) (Jonathan Bowers)

=== Construction ===
Its construction is based on the E7 group. Coxeter named it as 3_{21} by its bifurcating Coxeter-Dynkin diagram, with a single node on the end of the 3-node sequence.

The facet information can be extracted from its Coxeter-Dynkin diagram,.

Removing the node on the short branch leaves the birectified 6-simplex,.

Removing the node on the end of the 2-length branch leaves the birectified 6-orthoplex in its alternated form: t_{2}(3_{11}),.

Removing the node on the end of the 3-length branch leaves the rectified 2_{21} polytope in its alternated form: t_{1}(2_{21}),.

The vertex figure is determined by removing the ringed node and ringing the neighboring node. This makes rectified 5-cell-triangle duoprism,.

=== Images ===
Coxeter plane projections
E7	E6 / F4	B7 / A6
[18]	[12]	[7×2]
A5	D7 / B6	D6 / B5
[6]	[12/2]	[10]
D5 / B4 / A4	D4 / B3 / A2 / G2	D3 / B2 / A3
[8]	[6]	[4]

== See also ==
- List of E7 polytopes

== Notes ==
Fundamental convex regular and uniform polytopes in dimensions 2–10
Family	A_{n}	B_{n}	I_{2}(p) / D_{n}	E_{6} / E_{7} / E_{8} / F_{4} / G_{2}	H_{n}
Regular polygon	Triangle	Square	p-gon	Hexagon	Pentagon
Uniform polyhedron	Tetrahedron	Octahedron • Cube	Demicube		Dodecahedron • Icosahedron
Uniform polychoron	Pentachoron	16-cell • Tesseract	Demitesseract	24-cell	120-cell • 600-cell
Uniform 5-polytope	5-simplex	5-orthoplex • 5-cube	5-demicube		
Uniform 6-polytope	6-simplex	6-orthoplex • 6-cube	6-demicube	1_{22} • 2_{21}	
Uniform 7-polytope	7-simplex	7-orthoplex • 7-cube	7-demicube	1_{32} • 2_{31} • 3_{21}	
Uniform 8-polytope	8-simplex	8-orthoplex • 8-cube	8-demicube	1_{42} • 2_{41} • 4_{21}	
Uniform 9-polytope	9-simplex	9-orthoplex • 9-cube	9-demicube		
Uniform 10-polytope	10-simplex	10-orthoplex • 10-cube	10-demicube		
Uniform n-polytope	n-simplex	n-orthoplex • n-cube	n-demicube	1_{k2} • 2_{k1} • k_{21}	n-pentagonal polytope
Topics: Polytope families • Regular polytope • List of regular polytopes and compounds • Polytope operations
