= E7 polytope =

Orthographic projections in the E_{7} Coxeter plane
3_{21}	2_{31}	1_{32}

In 7-dimensional geometry, there are 127 uniform polytopes with E_{7} symmetry. The three simplest forms are the 3_{21}, 2_{31}, and 1_{32} polytopes, composed of 56, 126, and 576 vertices respectively.

They can be visualized as symmetric orthographic projections in Coxeter planes of the E_{7} Coxeter group, and other subgroups.

== Graphs ==
Symmetric orthographic projections of these 127 polytopes can be made in the E_{7}, E_{6}, D_{6}, D_{5}, D_{4}, D_{3}, A_{6}, A_{5}, A_{4}, A_{3}, A_{2} Coxeter planes. A_{k} has k+1 symmetry, D_{k} has 2(k-1) symmetry, and E_{6} and E_{7} have 12, 18 symmetry respectively.

For 10 of 127 polytopes (7 single rings, and 3 truncations), they are shown in these 8 symmetry planes, with vertices and edges drawn, and vertices colored by the number of overlapping vertices in each projective position in progressive order: red, orange, yellow, green, cyan, blue, purple, magenta, red-violet.

#	Coxeter plane graphs								Coxeter diagram Schläfli symbol Names
#	E_{7} [18]	E_{6}	A_{6} [7x2]	A_{5} [6]	A_{4} / D_{6} [10]	D_{5} [8]	A_{2} / D_{4} [6]	A_{3} / D_{3} [4]	Coxeter diagram Schläfli symbol Names
1									2_{31} (laq)
2									Rectified 2_{31} (rolaq)
3									Rectified 1_{32} (rolin)
4									1_{32} (lin)
5									Birectified 3_{21} (branq)
6									Rectified 3_{21} (ranq)
7									3_{21} (naq)
8									Truncated 2_{31} (talq)
9									Truncated 1_{32} (tilin)
10									Truncated 3_{21} (tanq)

Fundamental convex regular and uniform polytopes in dimensions 2–10
Family	A_{n}	B_{n}	I_{2}(p) / D_{n}	E_{6} / E_{7} / E_{8} / F_{4} / G_{2}	H_{n}
Regular polygon	Triangle	Square	p-gon	Hexagon	Pentagon
Uniform polyhedron	Tetrahedron	Octahedron • Cube	Demicube		Dodecahedron • Icosahedron
Uniform polychoron	Pentachoron	16-cell • Tesseract	Demitesseract	24-cell	120-cell • 600-cell
Uniform 5-polytope	5-simplex	5-orthoplex • 5-cube	5-demicube		
Uniform 6-polytope	6-simplex	6-orthoplex • 6-cube	6-demicube	1_{22} • 2_{21}	
Uniform 7-polytope	7-simplex	7-orthoplex • 7-cube	7-demicube	1_{32} • 2_{31} • 3_{21}	
Uniform 8-polytope	8-simplex	8-orthoplex • 8-cube	8-demicube	1_{42} • 2_{41} • 4_{21}	
Uniform 9-polytope	9-simplex	9-orthoplex • 9-cube	9-demicube		
Uniform 10-polytope	10-simplex	10-orthoplex • 10-cube	10-demicube		
Uniform n-polytope	n-simplex	n-orthoplex • n-cube	n-demicube	1_{k2} • 2_{k1} • k_{21}	n-pentagonal polytope
Topics: Polytope families • Regular polytope • List of regular polytopes and compounds • Polytope operations
