= 2 31 polytope =

Uniform Polytope

3_{21}	2_{31}	1_{32}
Rectified 3_{21}		Birectified 3_{21}
Rectified 2_{31}		Rectified 1_{32}
Orthogonal projections in E_{7} Coxeter plane

In 7-dimensional geometry, 2_{31} is a uniform polytope, constructed from the E7 group.

Its Coxeter symbol is 2_{31}, describing its bifurcating Coxeter-Dynkin diagram, with a single ring on the end of the 2-node branch.

The rectified 2_{31} is constructed by points at the mid-edges of the 2_{31}.

These polytopes are part of a family of 127 (or 2^{7}−1) convex uniform polytopes in seven dimensions, made of uniform polytope facets and vertex figures, defined by all combinations of rings in this Coxeter-Dynkin diagram:.

== 2_{31} polytope ==
Gosset 2_{31} polytope
Type	Uniform 7-polytope
Family	2_{k1} polytope
Schläfli symbol	{3,3,3^{3,1}}
Coxeter symbol	2_{31}
Coxeter diagram	
6-faces	632: 56 2_{21} 576 {3^{5}}
5-faces	4788: 756 2_{11} 4032 {3^{4}}
4-faces	16128: 4032 2_{01} 12096 {3^{3}}
Cells	20160 {3^{2}}
Faces	10080 {3}
Edges	2016
Vertices	126
Vertex figure	1_{31}
Petrie polygon	Octadecagon
Coxeter group	E_{7}, [3^{3,2,1}]
Properties	convex

The 2_{31} is composed of 126 vertices, 2016 edges, 10080 faces (triangles), 20160 cells (tetrahedra), 16128 4-faces (4-simplexes), 4788 5-faces (756 pentacrosses, and 4032 5-simplexes), 632 6-faces (576 6-simplexes and 56 2_{21}). Its vertex figure is a 6-demicube. Its 126 vertices represent the root vectors of the simple Lie group E_{7}.

This polytope is the vertex figure for a uniform tessellation of 7-dimensional space, 3_{31}.

=== Alternate names ===
- E. L. Elte named it V_{126} (for its 126 vertices) in his 1912 listing of semiregular polytopes.
- It was called 2_{31} by Coxeter for its bifurcating Coxeter-Dynkin diagram, with a single ring on the end of the 2-node sequence.
- Pentacontahexa-pentacosiheptacontahexa-exon (Acronym: laq) - 56-576 facetted polyexon (Jonathan Bowers)

=== Construction ===
It is created by a Wythoff construction upon a set of 7 hyperplane mirrors in 7-dimensional space.

The facet information can be extracted from its Coxeter-Dynkin diagram,.

Removing the node on the short branch leaves the 6-simplex. There are 576 of these facets. These facets are centered on the locations of the vertices of the 3_{21} polytope,.

Removing the node on the end of the 3-length branch leaves the 2_{21}. There are 56 of these facets. These facets are centered on the locations of the vertices of the 1_{32} polytope,.

The vertex figure is determined by removing the ringed node and ringing the neighboring node. This makes the 6-demicube, 1_{31},.

Seen in a configuration matrix, the element counts can be derived by mirror removal and ratios of Coxeter group orders.

E_{7}	k-face	f_{k}	f_{0}	f_{1}	f_{2}	f_{3}	f_{4}		f_{5}		f_{6}		k-figures	Notes
D_{6}	( )	f_{0}	126	32	240	640	160	480	60	192	12	32	6-demicube	E_{7}/D_{6} = 72·8!/32/6! = 126
A_{5}A_{1}	{ }	f_{1}	2	2016	15	60	20	60	15	30	6	6	rectified 5-simplex	E_{7}/A_{5}A_{1} = 72·8!/6!/2 = 2016
A_{3}A_{2}A_{1}	{3}	f_{2}	3	3	10080	8	4	12	6	8	4	2	tetrahedral prism	E_{7}/A_{3}A_{2}A_{1} = 72·8!/4!/3!/2 = 10080
A_{3}A_{2}	{3,3}	f_{3}	4	6	4	20160	1	3	3	3	3	1	tetrahedron	E_{7}/A_{3}A_{2} = 72·8!/4!/3! = 20160
A_{4}A_{2}	{3,3,3}	f_{4}	5	10	10	5	4032	*	3	0	3	0	{3}	E_{7}/A_{4}A_{2} = 72·8!/5!/3! = 4032
A_{4}A_{1}	{3,3,3}	f_{4}	5	10	10	5	*	12096	1	2	2	1	Isosceles triangle	E_{7}/A_{4}A_{1} = 72·8!/5!/2 = 12096
D_{5}A_{1}	{3,3,3,4}	f_{5}	10	40	80	80	16	16	756	*	2	0	{ }	E_{7}/D_{5}A_{1} = 72·8!/32/5! = 756
A_{5}	{3,3,3,3}	f_{5}	6	15	20	15	0	6	*	4032	1	1	{ }	E_{7}/A_{5} = 72·8!/6! = 72·8·7 = 4032
E_{6}	{3,3,3^{2,1}}	f_{6}	27	216	720	1080	216	432	27	72	56	*	( )	E_{7}/E_{6} = 72·8!/72/6! = 8·7 = 56
A_{6}	{3,3,3,3,3}	f_{6}	7	21	35	35	0	21	0	7	*	576	( )	E_{7}/A_{6} = 72·8!/7! = 72·8 = 576

=== Images ===
Coxeter plane projections
E7	E6 / F4	B6 / A6
[18]	[12]	[7×2]
A5	D7 / B6	D6 / B5
[6]	[12/2]	[10]
D5 / B4 / A4	D4 / B3 / A2 / G2	D3 / B2 / A3
[8]	[6]	[4]

=== Related polytopes and honeycombs ===
2_{k1} figures in n dimensions
Space	Finite						Euclidean	Hyperbolic
n	3	4	5	6	7	8	9	10
Coxeter group	E_{3}=A_{2}A_{1}	E_{4}=A_{4}	E_{5}=D_{5}	E_{6}	E_{7}	E_{8}	E_{9} = ${\tilde{E}}_{8}$ = E_{8}^{+}	E_{10} = ${\bar{T}}_8$ = E_{8}^{++}
Coxeter diagram								
Symmetry	[3^{−1,2,1}]	[3^{0,2,1}]	[[3^{1,2,1}]]	[3^{2,2,1}]	[3^{3,2,1}]	[3^{4,2,1}]	[3^{5,2,1}]	[3^{6,2,1}]
Order	12	120	384	51,840	2,903,040	696,729,600	∞	
Graph							-	-
Name	2_{−1,1}	2_{01}	2_{11}	2_{21}	2_{31}	2_{41}	2_{51}	2_{61}

== Rectified 2_{31} polytope ==
Rectified 2_{31} polytope
Type	Uniform 7-polytope
Family	2_{k1} polytope
Schläfli symbol	{3,3,3^{3,1}}
Coxeter symbol	t_{1}(2_{31})
Coxeter diagram	
6-faces	758
5-faces	10332
4-faces	47880
Cells	100800
Faces	90720
Edges	30240
Vertices	2016
Vertex figure	6-demicube
Petrie polygon	Octadecagon
Coxeter group	E_{7}, [3^{3,2,1}]
Properties	convex

The rectified 2_{31} is a rectification of the 2_{31} polytope, creating new vertices on the center of edge of the 2_{31}.

=== Alternate names ===
- Rectified pentacontahexa-pentacosiheptacontahexa-exon - as a rectified 56-576 facetted polyexon (Acronym: rolaq) (Jonathan Bowers)

=== Construction ===
It is created by a Wythoff construction upon a set of 7 hyperplane mirrors in 7-dimensional space.

The facet information can be extracted from its Coxeter-Dynkin diagram,.

Removing the node on the short branch leaves the rectified 6-simplex,.

Removing the node on the end of the 2-length branch leaves the, 6-demicube,.

Removing the node on the end of the 3-length branch leaves the rectified 2_{21},.

The vertex figure is determined by removing the ringed node and ringing the neighboring node.

=== Images ===
Coxeter plane projections
E7	E6 / F4	B6 / A6
[18]	[12]	[7×2]
A5	D7 / B6	D6 / B5
[6]	[12/2]	[10]
D5 / B4 / A4	D4 / B3 / A2 / G2	D3 / B2 / A3
[8]	[6]	[4]

== See also ==
- List of E7 polytopes

== Notes ==
Fundamental convex regular and uniform polytopes in dimensions 2–10
Family	A_{n}	B_{n}	I_{2}(p) / D_{n}	E_{6} / E_{7} / E_{8} / F_{4} / G_{2}	H_{n}
Regular polygon	Triangle	Square	p-gon	Hexagon	Pentagon
Uniform polyhedron	Tetrahedron	Octahedron • Cube	Demicube		Dodecahedron • Icosahedron
Uniform polychoron	Pentachoron	16-cell • Tesseract	Demitesseract	24-cell	120-cell • 600-cell
Uniform 5-polytope	5-simplex	5-orthoplex • 5-cube	5-demicube		
Uniform 6-polytope	6-simplex	6-orthoplex • 6-cube	6-demicube	1_{22} • 2_{21}	
Uniform 7-polytope	7-simplex	7-orthoplex • 7-cube	7-demicube	1_{32} • 2_{31} • 3_{21}	
Uniform 8-polytope	8-simplex	8-orthoplex • 8-cube	8-demicube	1_{42} • 2_{41} • 4_{21}	
Uniform 9-polytope	9-simplex	9-orthoplex • 9-cube	9-demicube		
Uniform 10-polytope	10-simplex	10-orthoplex • 10-cube	10-demicube		
Uniform n-polytope	n-simplex	n-orthoplex • n-cube	n-demicube	1_{k2} • 2_{k1} • k_{21}	n-pentagonal polytope
Topics: Polytope families • Regular polytope • List of regular polytopes and compounds • Polytope operations
