= 1 32 polytope =

Uniform polytope

3_{21}	2_{31}	1_{32}
Rectified 3_{21}		Birectified 3_{21}
Rectified 2_{31}		Rectified 1_{32}
Orthogonal projections in E_{7} Coxeter plane

In 7-dimensional geometry, 1_{32} is a uniform polytope, constructed from the E7 group.

Its Coxeter symbol is 1_{32}, describing its bifurcating Coxeter-Dynkin diagram, with a single ring on the end of one of the 1-node sequences.

The rectified 1_{32} is constructed by points at the mid-edges of the 1_{32}.

These polytopes are part of a family of 127 (2^{7}−1) convex uniform polytopes in 7 dimensions, made of uniform polytope facets and vertex figures, defined by all permutations of rings in this Coxeter-Dynkin diagram:.

== 1_{32} polytope ==
1_{32}
Type	Uniform 7-polytope
Family	1_{k2} polytope
Schläfli symbol	{3,3^{3,2}}
Coxeter symbol	1_{32}
Coxeter diagram	
6-faces	182: 56 1_{22} 126 1_{31}
5-faces	4284: 756 1_{21} 1512 1_{21} 2016 {3^{4}}
4-faces	23688: 4032 {3^{3}} 7560 1_{11} 12096 {3^{3}}
Cells	50400: 20160 {3^{2}} 30240 {3^{2}}
Faces	40320 {3}
Edges	10080
Vertices	576
Vertex figure	t_{2}{3^{5}}
Petrie polygon	Octadecagon
Coxeter group	E_{7}, [3^{3,2,1}], order 2903040
Properties	convex

This polytope can tessellate 7-dimensional space, with symbol 1_{33}, and Coxeter-Dynkin diagram,. It is the Voronoi cell of the dual E_{7}^{*} lattice.

=== Alternate names ===
- Emanuel Lodewijk Elte named it V_{576} (for its 576 vertices) in his 1912 listing of semiregular polytopes.
- Coxeter called it 1_{32} for its bifurcating Coxeter-Dynkin diagram, with a single ring on the end of the 1-node branch.
- Pentacontahexa-hecatonicosihexa-exon (acronym: lin) - 56-126 facetted polyexon (Jonathan Bowers)

=== Images ===
Coxeter plane projections
E7	E6 / F4	B7 / A6
[18]	[12]	[7×2]
A5	D7 / B6	D6 / B5
[6]	[12/2]	[10]
D5 / B4 / A4	D4 / B3 / A2 / G2	D3 / B2 / A3
[8]	[6]	[4]

=== Construction ===
It is created by a Wythoff construction upon a set of 7 hyperplane mirrors in 7-dimensional space.

The facet information can be extracted from its Coxeter-Dynkin diagram,

Removing the node on the end of the 2-length branch leaves the 6-demicube, 1_{31},

Removing the node on the end of the 3-length branch leaves the 1_{22},

The vertex figure is determined by removing the ringed node and ringing the neighboring node. This makes the birectified 6-simplex, 0_{32},

Seen in a configuration matrix, the element counts can be derived by mirror removal and ratios of Coxeter group orders.

E_{7}	k-face	f_{k}	f_{0}	f_{1}	f_{2}	f_{3}		f_{4}			f_{5}			f_{6}		k-figures	Notes
A_{6}	( )	f_{0}	576	35	210	140	210	35	105	105	21	42	21	7	7	2r{3,3,3,3,3}	E_{7}/A_{6} = 72·8!/7! = 576
A_{3}A_{2}A_{1}	{ }	f_{1}	2	10080	12	12	18	4	12	12	6	12	3	4	3	{3,3}x{3}	E_{7}/A_{3}A_{2}A_{1} = 72·8!/4!/3!/2 = 10080
A_{2}A_{2}A_{1}	{3}	f_{2}	3	3	40320	2	3	1	6	3	3	6	1	3	2	{ }∨{3}	E_{7}/A_{2}A_{2}A_{1} = 72·8!/3!/3!/2 = 40320
A_{3}A_{2}	{3,3}	f_{3}	4	6	4	20160	*	1	3	0	3	3	0	3	1	{3}∨( )	E_{7}/A_{3}A_{2} = 72·8!/4!/3! = 20160
A_{3}A_{1}A_{1}	{3,3}	f_{3}	4	6	4	*	30240	0	2	2	1	4	1	2	2	Phyllic disphenoid	E_{7}/A_{3}A_{1}A_{1} = 72·8!/4!/2/2 = 30240
A_{4}A_{2}	{3,3,3}	f_{4}	5	10	10	5	0	4032	*	*	3	0	0	3	0	{3}	E_{7}/A_{4}A_{2} = 72·8!/5!/3! = 4032
D_{4}A_{1}	{3,3,4}	f_{4}	8	24	32	8	8	*	7560	*	1	2	0	2	1	{ }∨( )	E_{7}/D_{4}A_{1} = 72·8!/8/4!/2 = 7560
A_{4}A_{1}	{3,3,3}	f_{4}	5	10	10	0	5	*	*	12096	0	2	1	1	2	{ }∨( )	E_{7}/A_{4}A_{1} = 72·8!/5!/2 = 12096
D_{5}A_{1}	h{4,3,3,3}	f_{5}	16	80	160	80	40	16	10	0	756	*	*	2	0	{ }	E_{7}/D_{5}A_{1} = 72·8!/16/5!/2 = 756
D_{5}	h{4,3,3,3}	f_{5}	16	80	160	40	80	0	10	16	*	1512	*	1	1	{ }	E_{7}/D_{5} = 72·8!/16/5! = 1512
A_{5}A_{1}	{3,3,3,3,3}	f_{5}	6	15	20	0	15	0	0	6	*	*	2016	0	2	{ }	E_{7}/A_{5}A_{1} = 72·8!/6!/2 = 2016
E_{6}	{3,3^{2,2}}	f_{6}	72	720	2160	1080	1080	216	270	216	27	27	0	56	*	( )	E_{7}/E_{6} = 72·8!/72/6! = 56
D_{6}	h{4,3,3,3,3}	f_{6}	32	240	640	160	480	0	60	192	0	12	32	*	126	( )	E_{7}/D_{6} = 72·8!/32/6! = 126

=== Related polytopes and honeycombs ===
The 1_{32} is third in a dimensional series of uniform polytopes and honeycombs, expressed by Coxeter as 1_{3k} series. The next figure is the Euclidean honeycomb 1_{33} and the final is a noncompact hyperbolic honeycomb, 1_{34}.

1_{3k} dimensional figures
Space	Finite				Euclidean	Hyperbolic
n	4	5	6	7	8	9
Coxeter group	A_{3}A_{1}	A_{5}	D_{6}	E_{7}	${\tilde{E}}_{7}$=E_{7}^{+}	${\bar{T}}_8$=E_{7}^{++}
Coxeter diagram						
Symmetry	[3^{−1,3,1}]	[3^{0,3,1}]	[3^{1,3,1}]	[3^{2,3,1}]	[[3^{3,3,1}]]	[3^{4,3,1}]
Order	48	720	23,040	2,903,040	∞	
Graph					-	-
Name	1_{3,-1}	1_{30}	1_{31}	1_{32}	1_{33}	1_{34}

1_{k2} figures in n dimensions
Space	Finite						Euclidean	Hyperbolic
n	3	4	5	6	7	8	9	10
Coxeter group	E_{3}=A_{2}A_{1}	E_{4}=A_{4}	E_{5}=D_{5}	E_{6}	E_{7}	E_{8}	E_{9} = ${\tilde{E}}_{8}$ = E_{8}^{+}	E_{10} = ${\bar{T}}_8$ = E_{8}^{++}
Coxeter diagram								
Symmetry (order)	[3^{−1,2,1}]	[3^{0,2,1}]	[3^{1,2,1}]	[[3^{2,2,1}]]	[3^{3,2,1}]	[3^{4,2,1}]	[3^{5,2,1}]	[3^{6,2,1}]
Order	12	120	1,920	103,680	2,903,040	696,729,600	∞	
Graph							-	-
Name	1_{−1,2}	1_{02}	1_{12}	1_{22}	1_{32}	1_{42}	1_{52}	1_{62}

== Rectified 1_{32} polytope ==
Rectified 1_{32}
Type	Uniform 7-polytope
Schläfli symbol	t_{1}{3,3^{3,2}}
Coxeter symbol	0_{321}
Coxeter-Dynkin diagram	
6-faces	758
5-faces	12348
4-faces	72072
Cells	191520
Faces	241920
Edges	120960
Vertices	10080
Vertex figure	{3,3}×{3}×{}
Coxeter group	E_{7}, [3^{3,2,1}], order 2903040
Properties	convex

The rectified 1_{32} (also called 0_{321}) is a rectification of the 1_{32} polytope, creating new vertices on the center of edge of the 1_{32}. Its vertex figure is a duoprism prism, the product of a regular tetrahedra and triangle, doubled into a prism: {3,3}×{3}×{}.

=== Alternate names ===
- Rectified pentacontahexa-hecatonicosihexa-exon for rectified 56-126 facetted polyexon (acronym: lanq) (Jonathan Bowers)

=== Construction ===
It is created by a Wythoff construction upon a set of 7 hyperplane mirrors in 7-dimensional space. These mirrors are represented by its Coxeter-Dynkin diagram,, and the ring represents the position of the active mirror(s).

Removing the node on the end of the 3-length branch leaves the rectified 1_{22} polytope,

Removing the node on the end of the 2-length branch leaves the demihexeract, 1_{31},

Removing the node on the end of the 1-length branch leaves the birectified 6-simplex,

The vertex figure is determined by removing the ringed node and ringing the neighboring node. This makes the tetrahedron-triangle duoprism prism, {3,3}×{3}×{},

Seen in a configuration matrix, the element counts can be derived by mirror removal and ratios of Coxeter group orders.

E_{7}	k-face	f_{k}	f_{0}	f_{1}	f_{2}			f_{3}					f_{4}						f_{5}					f_{6}			k-figures	Notes
A_{3}A_{2}A_{1}	( )	f_{0}	10080	24	24	12	36	8	12	36	18	24	4	12	18	24	12	6	6	8	12	6	3	4	2	3	{3,3}x{3}x{ }	E_{7}/A_{3}A_{2}A_{1} = 72·8!/4!/3!/2 = 10080
A_{2}A_{1}A_{1}	{ }	f_{1}	2	120960	2	1	3	1	2	6	3	3	1	3	6	6	3	1	3	3	6	2	1	3	1	2	( )v{3}v{ }	E_{7}/A_{2}A_{1}A_{1} = 72·8!/3!/2/2 = 120960
A_{2}A_{2}	0_{1}	f_{2}	3	3	80640	*	*	1	1	3	0	0	1	3	3	3	0	0	3	3	3	1	0	3	1	1	{3}v( )v( )	E_{7}/A_{2}A_{2} = 72·8!/3!/3! = 80640
A_{2}A_{2}A_{1}	0_{1}	f_{2}	3	3	*	40320	*	0	2	0	3	0	1	0	6	0	3	0	3	0	6	0	1	3	0	2	{3}v{ }	E_{7}/A_{2}A_{2}A_{1} = 72·8!/3!/3!/2 = 40320
A_{2}A_{1}A_{1}	0_{1}	f_{2}	3	3	*	*	120960	0	0	2	1	2	0	1	2	4	2	1	1	2	4	2	1	2	1	2	{ }v{ }v( )	E_{7}/A_{2}A_{1}A_{1} = 72·8!/3!/2/2 = 120960
A_{3}A_{2}	0_{2}	f_{3}	4	6	4	0	0	20160	*	*	*	*	1	3	0	0	0	0	3	3	0	0	0	3	1	0	{3}v( )	E_{7}/A_{3}A_{2} = 72·8!/4!/3! = 20160
A_{3}A_{2}	0_{11}	f_{3}	6	12	4	4	0	*	20160	*	*	*	1	0	3	0	0	0	3	0	3	0	0	3	0	1	{3}v( )	E_{7}/A_{3}A_{2} = 72·8!/4!/3! = 20160
A_{3}A_{1}	0_{11}	f_{3}	6	12	4	0	4	*	*	60480	*	*	0	1	1	2	0	0	1	2	2	1	0	2	1	1	Sphenoid	E_{7}/A_{3}A_{1} = 72·8!/4!/2 = 60480
A_{3}A_{1}A_{1}	0_{11}	f_{3}	6	12	0	4	4	*	*	*	30240	*	0	0	2	0	2	0	1	0	4	0	1	2	0	2	{ }v{ }	E_{7}/A_{3}A_{1}A_{1} = 72·8!/4!/2/2 = 30240
A_{3}A_{1}	0_{2}	f_{3}	4	6	0	0	4	*	*	*	*	60480	0	0	0	2	1	1	0	1	2	2	1	1	1	2	Sphenoid	E_{7}/A_{3}A_{1} = 72·8!/4!/2 = 60480
A_{4}A_{2}	0_{21}	f_{4}	10	30	20	10	0	5	5	0	0	0	4032	*	*	*	*	*	3	0	0	0	0	3	0	0	{3}	E_{7}/A_{4}A_{2} = 72·8!/5!/3! = 4032
A_{4}A_{1}	0_{21}	f_{4}	10	30	20	0	10	5	0	5	0	0	*	12096	*	*	*	*	1	2	0	0	0	2	1	0	{ }v()	E_{7}/A_{4}A_{1} = 72·8!/5!/2 = 12096
D_{4}A_{1}	0_{111}	f_{4}	24	96	32	32	32	0	8	8	8	0	*	*	7560	*	*	*	1	0	2	0	0	2	0	1	{ }v()	E_{7}/D_{4}A_{1} = 72·8!/8/4!/2 = 7560
A_{4}	0_{21}	f_{4}	10	30	10	0	20	0	0	5	0	5	*	*	*	24192	*	*	0	1	1	1	0	1	1	1	( )v( )v( )	E_{7}/A_{4} = 72·8!/5! = 34192
A_{4}A_{1}	0_{21}	f_{4}	10	30	0	10	20	0	0	0	5	5	*	*	*	*	12096	*	0	0	2	0	1	1	0	2	{ }v()	E_{7}/A_{4}A_{1} = 72·8!/5!/2 = 12096
A_{4}A_{1}	0_{3}	f_{4}	5	10	0	0	10	0	0	0	0	5	*	*	*	*	*	12096	0	0	0	2	1	0	1	2	{ }v()	E_{7}/A_{4}A_{1} = 72·8!/5!/2 = 12096
D_{5}A_{1}	0_{211}	f_{5}	80	480	320	160	160	80	80	80	40	0	16	16	10	0	0	0	756	*	*	*	*	2	0	0	{ }	E_{7}/D_{5}A_{1} = 72·8!/16/5!/2 = 756
A_{5}	0_{22}	f_{5}	20	90	60	0	60	15	0	30	0	15	0	6	0	6	0	0	*	4032	*	*	*	1	1	0	{ }	E_{7}/A_{5} = 72·8!/6! = 4032
D_{5}	0_{211}	f_{5}	80	480	160	160	320	0	40	80	80	80	0	0	10	16	16	0	*	*	1512	*	*	1	0	1	{ }	E_{7}/D_{5} = 72·8!/16/5! = 1512
A_{5}	0_{31}	f_{5}	15	60	20	0	60	0	0	15	0	30	0	0	0	6	0	6	*	*	*	4032	*	0	1	1	{ }	E_{7}/A_{5} = 72·8!/6! = 4032
A_{5}A_{1}	0_{31}	f_{5}	15	60	0	20	60	0	0	0	15	30	0	0	0	0	6	6	*	*	*	*	2016	0	0	2	{ }	E_{7}/A_{5}A_{1} = 72·8!/6!/2 = 2016
E_{6}	0_{221}	f_{6}	720	6480	4320	2160	4320	1080	1080	2160	1080	1080	216	432	270	432	216	0	27	72	27	0	0	56	*	*	( )	E_{7}/E_{6} = 72·8!/72/6! = 56
A_{6}	0_{32}	f_{6}	35	210	140	0	210	35	0	105	0	105	0	21	0	42	0	21	0	7	0	7	0	*	576	*	( )	E_{7}/A_{6} = 72·8!/7! = 576
D_{6}	0_{311}	f_{6}	240	1920	640	640	1920	0	160	480	480	960	0	0	60	192	192	192	0	0	12	32	32	*	*	126	( )	E_{7}/D_{6} = 72·8!/32/6! = 126

=== Images ===
Coxeter plane projections
E7	E6 / F4	B7 / A6
[18]	[12]	[14]
A5	D7 / B6	D6 / B5
[6]	[12/2]	[10]
D5 / B4 / A4	D4 / B3 / A2 / G2	D3 / B2 / A3
[8]	[6]	[4]

== See also ==
- List of E7 polytopes

== Notes ==
Fundamental convex regular and uniform polytopes in dimensions 2–10
Family	A_{n}	B_{n}	I_{2}(p) / D_{n}	E_{6} / E_{7} / E_{8} / F_{4} / G_{2}	H_{n}
Regular polygon	Triangle	Square	p-gon	Hexagon	Pentagon
Uniform polyhedron	Tetrahedron	Octahedron • Cube	Demicube		Dodecahedron • Icosahedron
Uniform polychoron	Pentachoron	16-cell • Tesseract	Demitesseract	24-cell	120-cell • 600-cell
Uniform 5-polytope	5-simplex	5-orthoplex • 5-cube	5-demicube		
Uniform 6-polytope	6-simplex	6-orthoplex • 6-cube	6-demicube	1_{22} • 2_{21}	
Uniform 7-polytope	7-simplex	7-orthoplex • 7-cube	7-demicube	1_{32} • 2_{31} • 3_{21}	
Uniform 8-polytope	8-simplex	8-orthoplex • 8-cube	8-demicube	1_{42} • 2_{41} • 4_{21}	
Uniform 9-polytope	9-simplex	9-orthoplex • 9-cube	9-demicube		
Uniform 10-polytope	10-simplex	10-orthoplex • 10-cube	10-demicube		
Uniform n-polytope	n-simplex	n-orthoplex • n-cube	n-demicube	1_{k2} • 2_{k1} • k_{21}	n-pentagonal polytope
Topics: Polytope families • Regular polytope • List of regular polytopes and compounds • Polytope operations
