= Seven-dimensional space =

Geometric space with seven dimensions

Seven-dimensional (7D) space is a sequence of n real numbers (when n = 7) that can be understood as a location in n-dimensional space. Often such a space is studied as a vector space, without any notion of distance. Seven-dimensional Euclidean space is seven-dimensional space equipped with a Euclidean metric, which is defined by the dot product.

More generally, the term may refer to a seven-dimensional vector space over any field, such as a seven-dimensional complex vector space, which has 14 real dimensions. It may also refer to a seven-dimensional manifold such as a 7-sphere, or a variety of other geometric constructions.

Seven-dimensional spaces have a number of special properties, many of them related to the octonions. An especially distinctive property is that a cross product can be defined only in three or seven dimensions. This is related to Hurwitz's theorem, which prohibits the existence of algebraic structures like the quaternions and octonions in dimensions other than 2, 4, and 8. The first exotic spheres ever discovered were seven-dimensional.

== Geometry ==
=== 7-polytope ===
A polytope in seven dimensions is called a 7-polytope. The most studied are the regular polytopes, of which there are only three in seven dimensions: the 7-simplex, 7-cube, and 7-orthoplex. A wider family are the uniform 7-polytopes, constructed from fundamental symmetry domains of reflection, each domain defined by a Coxeter group. Each uniform polytope is defined by a ringed Coxeter-Dynkin diagram. The 7-demicube is a unique polytope from the D_{7} family, and 3_{21}, 2_{31}, and 1_{32} polytopes from the E_{7} family.

Regular and uniform polytopes in seven dimensions (Displayed as orthogonal projections in each Coxeter plane of symmetry)
A_{6}	B_{7}		D_{7}	E_{7}		
altN=7-simplex	altN=7-cube	altN=7-orthoplex				
7-simplex	7-cube	7-orthoplex	7-demicube	3_{21}	2_{31}	1_{32}
			=			
{3,3,3,3,3,3}	{4,3,3,3,3,3}	{3,3,3,3,3,4}	{4,3,3,3,3,3} = {3,3^{4,1}}	{3,3,3,3^{2,1}}	{3,3,3^{3,1}}	{3,3^{3,2}}

=== 6-sphere ===
The 6-sphere or hypersphere in seven-dimensional Euclidean space is the six-dimensional surface equidistant from a point, e.g. the origin. It has symbol S^{6}, with formal definition for the 6-sphere with radius r of
$$S^6 = \left\{ x \in \mathbb{R}^7 : \|x\| = r\right\}.$$

The volume of the space bounded by this 6-sphere is
$$V_7\,=\frac{16 \pi^3}{105}\,r^7$$
which is 4.72477 × r^{7}, or 0.0369 of the 7-cube that contains the 6-sphere.

== Applications ==
=== Cross product ===
A cross product, that is a vector-valued, bilinear, anticommutative and orthogonal product of two vectors, is defined in seven dimensions. Along with the more usual cross product in three dimensions it is the only such product, except for trivial products.

=== Exotic spheres ===
In 1956, John Milnor constructed an exotic sphere in 7 dimensions and showed that there are at least 7 differentiable structures on the 7-sphere. In 1963 he showed that the exact number of such structures is 28.

== See also ==
- Euclidean geometry
- List of geometry topics
- List of regular polytopes
