= Uniform 8-polytope =

Polytope contained by 7-polytope facets

Graphs of three regular and related uniform polytopes.
8-simplex	Rectified 8-simplex	Truncated 8-simplex
Cantellated 8-simplex	Runcinated 8-simplex	Stericated 8-simplex
Pentellated 8-simplex	Hexicated 8-simplex	Heptellated 8-simplex
8-orthoplex	Rectified 8-orthoplex	Truncated 8-orthoplex
Cantellated 8-orthoplex		Runcinated 8-orthoplex
Hexicated 8-orthoplex		Cantellated 8-cube
Runcinated 8-cube	Stericated 8-cube	Pentellated 8-cube
Hexicated 8-cube		Heptellated 8-cube
8-cube	Rectified 8-cube	Truncated 8-cube
8-demicube	Truncated 8-demicube	Cantellated 8-demicube
Runcinated 8-demicube		Stericated 8-demicube
Pentellated 8-demicube		Hexicated 8-demicube
4_{21}	1_{42}	2_{41}

In eight-dimensional geometry, an eight-dimensional polytope or 8-polytope is a polytope contained by 7-polytope facets, each 6-polytope ridge being shared by exactly two 7-polytope facets.

A uniform 8-polytope is one which is vertex-transitive, and constructed from uniform 7-polytope facets.

== Regular 8-polytopes ==
Regular 8-polytopes can be represented by the Schläfli symbol {p,q,r,s,t,u,v}, with v {p,q,r,s,t,u} 7-polytope facets around each peak.

There are exactly three such convex regular 8-polytopes:

1. {3,3,3,3,3,3,3} - 8-simplex
2. {4,3,3,3,3,3,3} - 8-cube
3. {3,3,3,3,3,3,4} - 8-orthoplex

There are no nonconvex regular 8-polytopes.

== Characteristics ==
The topology of any given 8-polytope is defined by its Betti numbers and torsion coefficients.

The value of the Euler characteristic used to characterise polyhedra does not generalize usefully to higher dimensions, and is zero for all 8-polytopes, whatever their underlying topology. This inadequacy of the Euler characteristic to reliably distinguish between different topologies in higher dimensions led to the discovery of the more sophisticated Betti numbers.

Similarly, the notion of orientability of a polyhedron is insufficient to characterise the surface twistings of toroidal polytopes, and this led to the use of torsion coefficients.

== Uniform 8-polytopes by fundamental Coxeter groups ==
Uniform 8-polytopes with reflective symmetry can be generated by these four Coxeter groups, represented by permutations of rings of the Coxeter-Dynkin diagrams:

#	Coxeter group		Forms
1	A_{8}	[3^{7}]	135
2	BC_{8}	[4,3^{6}]	255
3	D_{8}	[3^{5,1,1}]	191 (64 unique)
4	E_{8}	[3^{4,2,1}]	255

Selected regular and uniform 8-polytopes from each family include:

1. Simplex family: A_{8} [3^{7}] -
  - 135 uniform 8-polytopes as permutations of rings in the group diagram, including one regular:
    1. {3^{7}} - 8-simplex or ennea-9-tope or enneazetton -
2. Hypercube/orthoplex family: B_{8} [4,3^{6}] -
  - 255 uniform 8-polytopes as permutations of rings in the group diagram, including two regular ones:
    1. {4,3^{6}} - 8-cube or octeract -
    2. {3^{6},4} - 8-orthoplex or octacross -
3. Demihypercube D_{8} family: [3^{5,1,1}] -
  - 191 uniform 8-polytopes as permutations of rings in the group diagram, including:
    1. {3,3^{5,1}} - 8-demicube or demiocteract, 1_{51} -; also as h{4,3^{6}} -
    2. {3,3,3,3,3,3^{1,1}} - 8-orthoplex, 5_{11} -
4. E-polytope family E_{8} family: [3^{4,1,1}] -
  - 255 uniform 8-polytopes as permutations of rings in the group diagram, including:
    1. {3,3,3,3,3^{2,1}} - Thorold Gosset's semiregular 4_{21},
    2. {3,3^{4,2}} - the uniform 1_{42},,
    3. {3,3,3^{4,1}} - the uniform 2_{41},

=== Uniform prismatic forms ===
There are many uniform prismatic families, including:

Uniform 8-polytope prism families
#	Coxeter group		Coxeter-Dynkin diagram
7+1
1	A_{7}A_{1}	[3,3,3,3,3,3]×[ ]	
2	B_{7}A_{1}	[4,3,3,3,3,3]×[ ]	
3	D_{7}A_{1}	[3^{4,1,1}]×[ ]	
4	E_{7}A_{1}	[3^{3,2,1}]×[ ]	
6+2
1	A_{6}I_{2}(p)	[3,3,3,3,3]×[p]	
2	B_{6}I_{2}(p)	[4,3,3,3,3]×[p]	
3	D_{6}I_{2}(p)	[3^{3,1,1}]×[p]	
4	E_{6}I_{2}(p)	[3,3,3,3,3]×[p]	
6+1+1
1	A_{6}A_{1}A_{1}	[3,3,3,3,3]×[ ]x[ ]	
2	B_{6}A_{1}A_{1}	[4,3,3,3,3]×[ ]x[ ]	
3	D_{6}A_{1}A_{1}	[3^{3,1,1}]×[ ]x[ ]	
4	E_{6}A_{1}A_{1}	[3,3,3,3,3]×[ ]x[ ]	
5+3
1	A_{5}A_{3}	[3^{4}]×[3,3]	
2	B_{5}A_{3}	[4,3^{3}]×[3,3]	
3	D_{5}A_{3}	[3^{2,1,1}]×[3,3]	
4	A_{5}B_{3}	[3^{4}]×[4,3]	
5	B_{5}B_{3}	[4,3^{3}]×[4,3]	
6	D_{5}B_{3}	[3^{2,1,1}]×[4,3]	
7	A_{5}H_{3}	[3^{4}]×[5,3]	
8	B_{5}H_{3}	[4,3^{3}]×[5,3]	
9	D_{5}H_{3}	[3^{2,1,1}]×[5,3]	
5+2+1
1	A_{5}I_{2}(p)A_{1}	[3,3,3]×[p]×[ ]	
2	B_{5}I_{2}(p)A_{1}	[4,3,3]×[p]×[ ]	
3	D_{5}I_{2}(p)A_{1}	[3^{2,1,1}]×[p]×[ ]	
5+1+1+1
1	A_{5}A_{1}A_{1}A_{1}	[3,3,3]×[ ]×[ ]×[ ]	
2	B_{5}A_{1}A_{1}A_{1}	[4,3,3]×[ ]×[ ]×[ ]	
3	D_{5}A_{1}A_{1}A_{1}	[3^{2,1,1}]×[ ]×[ ]×[ ]	
4+4
1	A_{4}A_{4}	[3,3,3]×[3,3,3]	
2	B_{4}A_{4}	[4,3,3]×[3,3,3]	
3	D_{4}A_{4}	[3^{1,1,1}]×[3,3,3]	
4	F_{4}A_{4}	[3,4,3]×[3,3,3]	
5	H_{4}A_{4}	[5,3,3]×[3,3,3]	
6	B_{4}B_{4}	[4,3,3]×[4,3,3]	
7	D_{4}B_{4}	[3^{1,1,1}]×[4,3,3]	
8	F_{4}B_{4}	[3,4,3]×[4,3,3]	
9	H_{4}B_{4}	[5,3,3]×[4,3,3]	
10	D_{4}D_{4}	[3^{1,1,1}]×[3^{1,1,1}]	
11	F_{4}D_{4}	[3,4,3]×[3^{1,1,1}]	
12	H_{4}D_{4}	[5,3,3]×[3^{1,1,1}]	
13	F_{4}×F_{4}	[3,4,3]×[3,4,3]	
14	H_{4}×F_{4}	[5,3,3]×[3,4,3]	
15	H_{4}H_{4}	[5,3,3]×[5,3,3]	
4+3+1
1	A_{4}A_{3}A_{1}	[3,3,3]×[3,3]×[ ]	
2	A_{4}B_{3}A_{1}	[3,3,3]×[4,3]×[ ]	
3	A_{4}H_{3}A_{1}	[3,3,3]×[5,3]×[ ]	
4	B_{4}A_{3}A_{1}	[4,3,3]×[3,3]×[ ]	
5	B_{4}B_{3}A_{1}	[4,3,3]×[4,3]×[ ]	
6	B_{4}H_{3}A_{1}	[4,3,3]×[5,3]×[ ]	
7	H_{4}A_{3}A_{1}	[5,3,3]×[3,3]×[ ]	
8	H_{4}B_{3}A_{1}	[5,3,3]×[4,3]×[ ]	
9	H_{4}H_{3}A_{1}	[5,3,3]×[5,3]×[ ]	
10	F_{4}A_{3}A_{1}	[3,4,3]×[3,3]×[ ]	
11	F_{4}B_{3}A_{1}	[3,4,3]×[4,3]×[ ]	
12	F_{4}H_{3}A_{1}	[3,4,3]×[5,3]×[ ]	
13	D_{4}A_{3}A_{1}	[3^{1,1,1}]×[3,3]×[ ]	
14	D_{4}B_{3}A_{1}	[3^{1,1,1}]×[4,3]×[ ]	
15	D_{4}H_{3}A_{1}	[3^{1,1,1}]×[5,3]×[ ]	
4+2+2
...
4+2+1+1
...
4+1+1+1+1
...
3+3+2
1	A_{3}A_{3}I_{2}(p)	[3,3]×[3,3]×[p]	
2	B_{3}A_{3}I_{2}(p)	[4,3]×[3,3]×[p]	
3	H_{3}A_{3}I_{2}(p)	[5,3]×[3,3]×[p]	
4	B_{3}B_{3}I_{2}(p)	[4,3]×[4,3]×[p]	
5	H_{3}B_{3}I_{2}(p)	[5,3]×[4,3]×[p]	
6	H_{3}H_{3}I_{2}(p)	[5,3]×[5,3]×[p]	
3+3+1+1
1	A_{3}^{2}A_{1}^{2}	[3,3]×[3,3]×[ ]×[ ]	
2	B_{3}A_{3}A_{1}^{2}	[4,3]×[3,3]×[ ]×[ ]	
3	H_{3}A_{3}A_{1}^{2}	[5,3]×[3,3]×[ ]×[ ]	
4	B_{3}B_{3}A_{1}^{2}	[4,3]×[4,3]×[ ]×[ ]	
5	H_{3}B_{3}A_{1}^{2}	[5,3]×[4,3]×[ ]×[ ]	
6	H_{3}H_{3}A_{1}^{2}	[5,3]×[5,3]×[ ]×[ ]	
3+2+2+1
1	A_{3}I_{2}(p)I_{2}(q)A_{1}	[3,3]×[p]×[q]×[ ]	
2	B_{3}I_{2}(p)I_{2}(q)A_{1}	[4,3]×[p]×[q]×[ ]	
3	H_{3}I_{2}(p)I_{2}(q)A_{1}	[5,3]×[p]×[q]×[ ]	
3+2+1+1+1
1	A_{3}I_{2}(p)A_{1}^{3}	[3,3]×[p]×[ ]x[ ]×[ ]	
2	B_{3}I_{2}(p)A_{1}^{3}	[4,3]×[p]×[ ]x[ ]×[ ]	
3	H_{3}I_{2}(p)A_{1}^{3}	[5,3]×[p]×[ ]x[ ]×[ ]	
3+1+1+1+1+1
1	A_{3}A_{1}^{5}	[3,3]×[ ]x[ ]×[ ]x[ ]×[ ]	
2	B_{3}A_{1}^{5}	[4,3]×[ ]x[ ]×[ ]x[ ]×[ ]	
3	H_{3}A_{1}^{5}	[5,3]×[ ]x[ ]×[ ]x[ ]×[ ]	
2+2+2+2
1	I_{2}(p)I_{2}(q)I_{2}(r)I_{2}(s)	[p]×[q]×[r]×[s]	
2+2+2+1+1
1	I_{2}(p)I_{2}(q)I_{2}(r)A_{1}^{2}	[p]×[q]×[r]×[ ]×[ ]	
2+2+1+1+1+1
2	I_{2}(p)I_{2}(q)A_{1}^{4}	[p]×[q]×[ ]×[ ]×[ ]×[ ]	
2+1+1+1+1+1+1
1	I_{2}(p)A_{1}^{6}	[p]×[ ]×[ ]×[ ]×[ ]×[ ]×[ ]	
1+1+1+1+1+1+1+1
1	A_{1}^{8}	[ ]×[ ]×[ ]×[ ]×[ ]×[ ]×[ ]×[ ]	

=== The A_{8} family ===
The A_{8} family has symmetry of order 362880 (9 factorial).

There are 135 forms based on all permutations of the Coxeter-Dynkin diagrams with one or more rings (128 + 8 − 1 cases). These are all enumerated below. Bowers-style acronym names are given in parentheses for cross-referencing.

See also a list of 8-simplex polytopes for symmetric Coxeter plane graphs of these polytopes.

A_{8} uniform polytopes
#	Coxeter-Dynkin diagram	Truncation indices	Johnson name (acronym)	Basepoint	Element counts							
#	Coxeter-Dynkin diagram	Truncation indices	Johnson name (acronym)	Basepoint	7	6	5	4	3	2	1	0
1		t_{0}	8-simplex (ene)	(0,0,0,0,0,0,0,0,1)	9	36	84	126	126	84	36	9
2		t_{1}	Rectified 8-simplex (rene)	(0,0,0,0,0,0,0,1,1)	18	108	336	630	576	588	252	36
3		t_{2}	Birectified 8-simplex (brene)	(0,0,0,0,0,0,1,1,1)	18	144	588	1386	2016	1764	756	84
4		t_{3}	Trirectified 8-simplex (trene)	(0,0,0,0,0,1,1,1,1)							1260	126
5		t_{0,1}	Truncated 8-simplex (tene)	(0,0,0,0,0,0,0,1,2)							288	72
6		t_{0,2}	Cantellated 8-simplex (srene)	(0,0,0,0,0,0,1,1,2)							1764	252
7		t_{1,2}	Bitruncated 8-simplex (batene)	(0,0,0,0,0,0,1,2,2)							1008	252
8		t_{0,3}	Runcinated 8-simplex (spene)	(0,0,0,0,0,1,1,1,2)							4536	504
9		t_{1,3}	Bicantellated 8-simplex (sabrene)	(0,0,0,0,0,1,1,2,2)							5292	756
10		t_{2,3}	Tritruncated 8-simplex (tatene)	(0,0,0,0,0,1,2,2,2)							2016	504
11		t_{0,4}	Stericated 8-simplex (secane)	(0,0,0,0,1,1,1,1,2)							6300	630
12		t_{1,4}	Biruncinated 8-simplex (sabpene)	(0,0,0,0,1,1,1,2,2)							11340	1260
13		t_{2,4}	Tricantellated 8-simplex (satrene)	(0,0,0,0,1,1,2,2,2)							8820	1260
14		t_{3,4}	Quadritruncated 8-simplex (be)	(0,0,0,0,1,2,2,2,2)							2520	630
15		t_{0,5}	Pentellated 8-simplex (sotane)	(0,0,0,1,1,1,1,1,2)							5040	504
16		t_{1,5}	Bistericated 8-simplex (sobcane)	(0,0,0,1,1,1,1,2,2)							12600	1260
17		t_{2,5}	Triruncinated 8-simplex (satpeb)	(0,0,0,1,1,1,2,2,2)							15120	1680
18		t_{0,6}	Hexicated 8-simplex (supane)	(0,0,1,1,1,1,1,1,2)							2268	252
19		t_{1,6}	Bipentellated 8-simplex (sobteb)	(0,0,1,1,1,1,1,2,2)							7560	756
20		t_{0,7}	Heptellated 8-simplex (soxeb)	(0,1,1,1,1,1,1,1,2)							504	72
21		t_{0,1,2}	Cantitruncated 8-simplex (grene)	(0,0,0,0,0,0,1,2,3)							2016	504
22		t_{0,1,3}	Runcitruncated 8-simplex (potane)	(0,0,0,0,0,1,1,2,3)							9828	1512
23		t_{0,2,3}	Runcicantellated 8-simplex (prene)	(0,0,0,0,0,1,2,2,3)							6804	1512
24		t_{1,2,3}	Bicantitruncated 8-simplex (gabrene)	(0,0,0,0,0,1,2,3,3)							6048	1512
25		t_{0,1,4}	Steritruncated 8-simplex (catene)	(0,0,0,0,1,1,1,2,3)							20160	2520
26		t_{0,2,4}	Stericantellated 8-simplex (crane)	(0,0,0,0,1,1,2,2,3)							26460	3780
27		t_{1,2,4}	Biruncitruncated 8-simplex (biptene)	(0,0,0,0,1,1,2,3,3)							22680	3780
28		t_{0,3,4}	Steriruncinated 8-simplex (capene)	(0,0,0,0,1,2,2,2,3)							12600	2520
29		t_{1,3,4}	Biruncicantellated 8-simplex (biprene)	(0,0,0,0,1,2,2,3,3)							18900	3780
30		t_{2,3,4}	Tricantitruncated 8-simplex (gatrene)	(0,0,0,0,1,2,3,3,3)							10080	2520
31		t_{0,1,5}	Pentitruncated 8-simplex (tetane)	(0,0,0,1,1,1,1,2,3)							21420	2520
32		t_{0,2,5}	Penticantellated 8-simplex (turane)	(0,0,0,1,1,1,2,2,3)							42840	5040
33		t_{1,2,5}	Bisteritruncated 8-simplex (bictane)	(0,0,0,1,1,1,2,3,3)							35280	5040
34		t_{0,3,5}	Pentiruncinated 8-simplex (topene)	(0,0,0,1,1,2,2,2,3)							37800	5040
35		t_{1,3,5}	Bistericantellated 8-simplex (bocrane)	(0,0,0,1,1,2,2,3,3)							52920	7560
36		t_{2,3,5}	Triruncitruncated 8-simplex (toprane)	(0,0,0,1,1,2,3,3,3)							27720	5040
37		t_{0,4,5}	Pentistericated 8-simplex (tecane)	(0,0,0,1,2,2,2,2,3)							13860	2520
38		t_{1,4,5}	Bisteriruncinated 8-simplex (bacpane)	(0,0,0,1,2,2,2,3,3)							30240	5040
39		t_{0,1,6}	Hexitruncated 8-simplex (putene)	(0,0,1,1,1,1,1,2,3)							12096	1512
40		t_{0,2,6}	Hexicantellated 8-simplex (purene)	(0,0,1,1,1,1,2,2,3)							34020	3780
41		t_{1,2,6}	Bipentitruncated 8-simplex (bitotene)	(0,0,1,1,1,1,2,3,3)							26460	3780
42		t_{0,3,6}	Hexiruncinated 8-simplex (pupene)	(0,0,1,1,1,2,2,2,3)							45360	5040
43		t_{1,3,6}	Bipenticantellated 8-simplex (bitrene)	(0,0,1,1,1,2,2,3,3)							60480	7560
44		t_{0,4,6}	Hexistericated 8-simplex (pucane)	(0,0,1,1,2,2,2,2,3)							30240	3780
45		t_{0,5,6}	Hexipentellated 8-simplex (putane)	(0,0,1,2,2,2,2,2,3)							9072	1512
46		t_{0,1,7}	Heptitruncated 8-simplex (xotane)	(0,1,1,1,1,1,1,2,3)							3276	504
47		t_{0,2,7}	Hepticantellated 8-simplex (xorene)	(0,1,1,1,1,1,2,2,3)							12852	1512
48		t_{0,3,7}	Heptiruncinated 8-simplex (xapane)	(0,1,1,1,1,2,2,2,3)							23940	2520
49		t_{0,1,2,3}	Runcicantitruncated 8-simplex (gapene)	(0,0,0,0,0,1,2,3,4)							12096	3024
50		t_{0,1,2,4}	Stericantitruncated 8-simplex (cograne)	(0,0,0,0,1,1,2,3,4)							45360	7560
51		t_{0,1,3,4}	Steriruncitruncated 8-simplex (coptane)	(0,0,0,0,1,2,2,3,4)							34020	7560
52		t_{0,2,3,4}	Steriruncicantellated 8-simplex (coprene)	(0,0,0,0,1,2,3,3,4)							34020	7560
53		t_{1,2,3,4}	Biruncicantitruncated 8-simplex (gabpene)	(0,0,0,0,1,2,3,4,4)							30240	7560
54		t_{0,1,2,5}	Penticantitruncated 8-simplex (tograne)	(0,0,0,1,1,1,2,3,4)							70560	10080
55		t_{0,1,3,5}	Pentiruncitruncated 8-simplex (taptane)	(0,0,0,1,1,2,2,3,4)							98280	15120
56		t_{0,2,3,5}	Pentiruncicantellated 8-simplex (taprene)	(0,0,0,1,1,2,3,3,4)							90720	15120
57		t_{1,2,3,5}	Bistericantitruncated 8-simplex (bocagrane)	(0,0,0,1,1,2,3,4,4)							83160	15120
58		t_{0,1,4,5}	Pentisteritruncated 8-simplex (tectane)	(0,0,0,1,2,2,2,3,4)							50400	10080
59		t_{0,2,4,5}	Pentistericantellated 8-simplex (tocrane)	(0,0,0,1,2,2,3,3,4)							83160	15120
60		t_{1,2,4,5}	Bisteriruncitruncated 8-simplex (bicpotane)	(0,0,0,1,2,2,3,4,4)							68040	15120
61		t_{0,3,4,5}	Pentisteriruncinated 8-simplex (tecpane)	(0,0,0,1,2,3,3,3,4)							50400	10080
62		t_{1,3,4,5}	Bisteriruncicantellated 8-simplex (bicprene)	(0,0,0,1,2,3,3,4,4)							75600	15120
63		t_{2,3,4,5}	Triruncicantitruncated 8-simplex (gatpeb)	(0,0,0,1,2,3,4,4,4)							40320	10080
64		t_{0,1,2,6}	Hexicantitruncated 8-simplex (pugrane)	(0,0,1,1,1,1,2,3,4)							52920	7560
65		t_{0,1,3,6}	Hexiruncitruncated 8-simplex (puptane)	(0,0,1,1,1,2,2,3,4)							113400	15120
66		t_{0,2,3,6}	Hexiruncicantellated 8-simplex (puprene)	(0,0,1,1,1,2,3,3,4)							98280	15120
67		t_{1,2,3,6}	Bipenticantitruncated 8-simplex (batograne)	(0,0,1,1,1,2,3,4,4)							90720	15120
68		t_{0,1,4,6}	Hexisteritruncated 8-simplex (puctane)	(0,0,1,1,2,2,2,3,4)							105840	15120
69		t_{0,2,4,6}	Hexistericantellated 8-simplex (pucrene)	(0,0,1,1,2,2,3,3,4)							158760	22680
70		t_{1,2,4,6}	Bipentiruncitruncated 8-simplex (batpitane)	(0,0,1,1,2,2,3,4,4)							136080	22680
71		t_{0,3,4,6}	Hexisteriruncinated 8-simplex (pocapine)	(0,0,1,1,2,3,3,3,4)							90720	15120
72		t_{1,3,4,6}	Bipentiruncicantellated 8-simplex (bitprop)	(0,0,1,1,2,3,3,4,4)							136080	22680
73		t_{0,1,5,6}	Hexipentitruncated 8-simplex (putatine)	(0,0,1,2,2,2,2,3,4)							41580	7560
74		t_{0,2,5,6}	Hexipenticantellated 8-simplex (putarene)	(0,0,1,2,2,2,3,3,4)							98280	15120
75		t_{1,2,5,6}	Bipentisteritruncated 8-simplex (batcotab)	(0,0,1,2,2,2,3,4,4)							75600	15120
76		t_{0,3,5,6}	Hexipentiruncinated 8-simplex (putapene)	(0,0,1,2,2,3,3,3,4)							98280	15120
77		t_{0,4,5,6}	Hexipentistericated 8-simplex (putacane)	(0,0,1,2,3,3,3,3,4)							41580	7560
78		t_{0,1,2,7}	Hepticantitruncated 8-simplex (xograne)	(0,1,1,1,1,1,2,3,4)							18144	3024
79		t_{0,1,3,7}	Heptiruncitruncated 8-simplex (xaptane)	(0,1,1,1,1,2,2,3,4)							56700	7560
80		t_{0,2,3,7}	Heptiruncicantellated 8-simplex (xeprane)	(0,1,1,1,1,2,3,3,4)							45360	7560
81		t_{0,1,4,7}	Heptisteritruncated 8-simplex (xactane)	(0,1,1,1,2,2,2,3,4)							80640	10080
82		t_{0,2,4,7}	Heptistericantellated 8-simplex (xacrene)	(0,1,1,1,2,2,3,3,4)							113400	15120
83		t_{0,3,4,7}	Heptisteriruncinated 8-simplex (xocapob)	(0,1,1,1,2,3,3,3,4)							60480	10080
84		t_{0,1,5,7}	Heptipentitruncated 8-simplex (xotatine)	(0,1,1,2,2,2,2,3,4)							56700	7560
85		t_{0,2,5,7}	Heptipenticantellated 8-simplex (xotrab)	(0,1,1,2,2,2,3,3,4)							120960	15120
86		t_{0,1,6,7}	Heptihexitruncated 8-simplex (xupatab)	(0,1,2,2,2,2,2,3,4)							18144	3024
87		t_{0,1,2,3,4}	Steriruncicantitruncated 8-simplex (gacene)	(0,0,0,0,1,2,3,4,5)							60480	15120
88		t_{0,1,2,3,5}	Pentiruncicantitruncated 8-simplex (togapene)	(0,0,0,1,1,2,3,4,5)							166320	30240
89		t_{0,1,2,4,5}	Pentistericantitruncated 8-simplex (tecograne)	(0,0,0,1,2,2,3,4,5)							136080	30240
90		t_{0,1,3,4,5}	Pentisteriruncitruncated 8-simplex (tecpatane)	(0,0,0,1,2,3,3,4,5)							136080	30240
91		t_{0,2,3,4,5}	Pentisteriruncicantellated 8-simplex (ticprane)	(0,0,0,1,2,3,4,4,5)							136080	30240
92		t_{1,2,3,4,5}	Bisteriruncicantitruncated 8-simplex (gobcane)	(0,0,0,1,2,3,4,5,5)							120960	30240
93		t_{0,1,2,3,6}	Hexiruncicantitruncated 8-simplex (pogapene)	(0,0,1,1,1,2,3,4,5)							181440	30240
94		t_{0,1,2,4,6}	Hexistericantitruncated 8-simplex (pocagrane)	(0,0,1,1,2,2,3,4,5)							272160	45360
95		t_{0,1,3,4,6}	Hexisteriruncitruncated 8-simplex (pocpatine)	(0,0,1,1,2,3,3,4,5)							249480	45360
96		t_{0,2,3,4,6}	Hexisteriruncicantellated 8-simplex (pocpurene)	(0,0,1,1,2,3,4,4,5)							249480	45360
97		t_{1,2,3,4,6}	Bipentiruncicantitruncated 8-simplex (botagpane)	(0,0,1,1,2,3,4,5,5)							226800	45360
98		t_{0,1,2,5,6}	Hexipenticantitruncated 8-simplex (potagrene)	(0,0,1,2,2,2,3,4,5)							151200	30240
99		t_{0,1,3,5,6}	Hexipentiruncitruncated 8-simplex (potaptane)	(0,0,1,2,2,3,3,4,5)							249480	45360
100		t_{0,2,3,5,6}	Hexipentiruncicantellated 8-simplex (putaprene)	(0,0,1,2,2,3,4,4,5)							226800	45360
101		t_{1,2,3,5,6}	Bipentistericantitruncated 8-simplex (betcagrane)	(0,0,1,2,2,3,4,5,5)							204120	45360
102		t_{0,1,4,5,6}	Hexipentisteritruncated 8-simplex (putcatine)	(0,0,1,2,3,3,3,4,5)							151200	30240
103		t_{0,2,4,5,6}	Hexipentistericantellated 8-simplex (potacrane)	(0,0,1,2,3,3,4,4,5)							249480	45360
104		t_{0,3,4,5,6}	Hexipentisteriruncinated 8-simplex (potcapane)	(0,0,1,2,3,4,4,4,5)							151200	30240
105		t_{0,1,2,3,7}	Heptiruncicantitruncated 8-simplex (xigpane)	(0,1,1,1,1,2,3,4,5)							83160	15120
106		t_{0,1,2,4,7}	Heptistericantitruncated 8-simplex (xecagrane)	(0,1,1,1,2,2,3,4,5)							196560	30240
107		t_{0,1,3,4,7}	Heptisteriruncitruncated 8-simplex (xucaptane)	(0,1,1,1,2,3,3,4,5)							166320	30240
108		t_{0,2,3,4,7}	Heptisteriruncicantellated 8-simplex (xecaprane)	(0,1,1,1,2,3,4,4,5)							166320	30240
109		t_{0,1,2,5,7}	Heptipenticantitruncated 8-simplex (xotagrane)	(0,1,1,2,2,2,3,4,5)							196560	30240
110		t_{0,1,3,5,7}	Heptipentiruncitruncated 8-simplex (xitaptene)	(0,1,1,2,2,3,3,4,5)							294840	45360
111		t_{0,2,3,5,7}	Heptipentiruncicantellated 8-simplex (xataprane)	(0,1,1,2,2,3,4,4,5)							272160	45360
112		t_{0,1,4,5,7}	Heptipentisteritruncated 8-simplex (xotcatene)	(0,1,1,2,3,3,3,4,5)							166320	30240
113		t_{0,1,2,6,7}	Heptihexicantitruncated 8-simplex (xopugrane)	(0,1,2,2,2,2,3,4,5)							83160	15120
114		t_{0,1,3,6,7}	Heptihexiruncitruncated 8-simplex (xopupatane)	(0,1,2,2,2,3,3,4,5)							196560	30240
115		t_{0,1,2,3,4,5}	Pentisteriruncicantitruncated 8-simplex (gotane)	(0,0,0,1,2,3,4,5,6)							241920	60480
116		t_{0,1,2,3,4,6}	Hexisteriruncicantitruncated 8-simplex (pogacane)	(0,0,1,1,2,3,4,5,6)							453600	90720
117		t_{0,1,2,3,5,6}	Hexipentiruncicantitruncated 8-simplex (potegpane)	(0,0,1,2,2,3,4,5,6)							408240	90720
118		t_{0,1,2,4,5,6}	Hexipentistericantitruncated 8-simplex (potacagrane)	(0,0,1,2,3,3,4,5,6)							408240	90720
119		t_{0,1,3,4,5,6}	Hexipentisteriruncitruncated 8-simplex (poticaptine)	(0,0,1,2,3,4,4,5,6)							408240	90720
120		t_{0,2,3,4,5,6}	Hexipentisteriruncicantellated 8-simplex (poticoprane)	(0,0,1,2,3,4,5,5,6)							408240	90720
121		t_{1,2,3,4,5,6}	Bipentisteriruncicantitruncated 8-simplex (gobteb)	(0,0,1,2,3,4,5,6,6)							362880	90720
122		t_{0,1,2,3,4,7}	Heptisteriruncicantitruncated 8-simplex (xogacane)	(0,1,1,1,2,3,4,5,6)							302400	60480
123		t_{0,1,2,3,5,7}	Heptipentiruncicantitruncated 8-simplex (xotagapane)	(0,1,1,2,2,3,4,5,6)							498960	90720
124		t_{0,1,2,4,5,7}	Heptipentistericantitruncated 8-simplex (xotcagrane)	(0,1,1,2,3,3,4,5,6)							453600	90720
125		t_{0,1,3,4,5,7}	Heptipentisteriruncitruncated 8-simplex (xotacaptane)	(0,1,1,2,3,4,4,5,6)							453600	90720
126		t_{0,2,3,4,5,7}	Heptipentisteriruncicantellated 8-simplex (xotacaparb)	(0,1,1,2,3,4,5,5,6)							453600	90720
127		t_{0,1,2,3,6,7}	Heptihexiruncicantitruncated 8-simplex (xupogapene)	(0,1,2,2,2,3,4,5,6)							302400	60480
128		t_{0,1,2,4,6,7}	Heptihexistericantitruncated 8-simplex (xupcagrene)	(0,1,2,2,3,3,4,5,6)							498960	90720
129		t_{0,1,3,4,6,7}	Heptihexisteriruncitruncated 8-simplex (xupacputob)	(0,1,2,2,3,4,4,5,6)							453600	90720
130		t_{0,1,2,5,6,7}	Heptihexipenticantitruncated 8-simplex (xuptagrab)	(0,1,2,3,3,3,4,5,6)							302400	60480
131		t_{0,1,2,3,4,5,6}	Hexipentisteriruncicantitruncated 8-simplex (gupane)	(0,0,1,2,3,4,5,6,7)							725760	181440
132		t_{0,1,2,3,4,5,7}	Heptipentisteriruncicantitruncated 8-simplex (xogtane)	(0,1,1,2,3,4,5,6,7)							816480	181440
133		t_{0,1,2,3,4,6,7}	Heptihexisteriruncicantitruncated 8-simplex (xupogacane)	(0,1,2,2,3,4,5,6,7)							816480	181440
134		t_{0,1,2,3,5,6,7}	Heptihexipentiruncicantitruncated 8-simplex (xuptagapene)	(0,1,2,3,3,4,5,6,7)							816480	181440
135		t_{0,1,2,3,4,5,6,7}	Omnitruncated 8-simplex (goxeb)	(0,1,2,3,4,5,6,7,8)							1451520	362880

=== The B_{8} family ===
The B_{8} family has symmetry of order 10321920 (8 factorial × 2^{8}). There are 255 forms based on all permutations of the Coxeter-Dynkin diagrams with one or more rings.

See also a list of B8 polytopes for symmetric Coxeter plane graphs of these polytopes.

B_{8} uniform polytopes
#	Coxeter-Dynkin diagram	Schläfli symbol	Name	Element counts							
#	Coxeter-Dynkin diagram	Schläfli symbol	Name	7	6	5	4	3	2	1	0
1		t_{0}{3^{6},4}	8-orthoplex Diacosipentacontahexazetton (ek)	256	1024	1792	1792	1120	448	112	16
2		t_{1}{3^{6},4}	Rectified 8-orthoplex Rectified diacosipentacontahexazetton (rek)	272	3072	8960	12544	10080	4928	1344	112
3		t_{2}{3^{6},4}	Birectified 8-orthoplex Birectified diacosipentacontahexazetton (bark)	272	3184	16128	34048	36960	22400	6720	448
4		t_{3}{3^{6},4}	Trirectified 8-orthoplex Trirectified diacosipentacontahexazetton (tark)	272	3184	16576	48384	71680	53760	17920	1120
5		t_{3}{4,3^{6}}	Trirectified 8-cube Trirectified octeract (tro)	272	3184	16576	47712	80640	71680	26880	1792
6		t_{2}{4,3^{6}}	Birectified 8-cube Birectified octeract (bro)	272	3184	14784	36960	55552	50176	21504	1792
7		t_{1}{4,3^{6}}	Rectified 8-cube Rectified octeract (recto)	272	2160	7616	15456	19712	16128	7168	1024
8		t_{0}{4,3^{6}}	8-cube Octeract (octo)	16	112	448	1120	1792	1792	1024	256
9		t_{0,1}{3^{6},4}	Truncated 8-orthoplex Truncated diacosipentacontahexazetton (tek)							1456	224
10		t_{0,2}{3^{6},4}	Cantellated 8-orthoplex Small rhombated diacosipentacontahexazetton (srek)							14784	1344
11		t_{1,2}{3^{6},4}	Bitruncated 8-orthoplex Bitruncated diacosipentacontahexazetton (batek)							8064	1344
12		t_{0,3}{3^{6},4}	Runcinated 8-orthoplex Small prismated diacosipentacontahexazetton (spek)							60480	4480
13		t_{1,3}{3^{6},4}	Bicantellated 8-orthoplex Small birhombated diacosipentacontahexazetton (sabork)							67200	6720
14		t_{2,3}{3^{6},4}	Tritruncated 8-orthoplex Tritruncated diacosipentacontahexazetton (tatek)							24640	4480
15		t_{0,4}{3^{6},4}	Stericated 8-orthoplex Small cellated diacosipentacontahexazetton (scak)							125440	8960
16		t_{1,4}{3^{6},4}	Biruncinated 8-orthoplex Small biprismated diacosipentacontahexazetton (sabpek)							215040	17920
17		t_{2,4}{3^{6},4}	Tricantellated 8-orthoplex Small trirhombated diacosipentacontahexazetton (satrek)							161280	17920
18		t_{3,4}{4,3^{6}}	Quadritruncated 8-cube Octeractidiacosipentacontahexazetton (oke)							44800	8960
19		t_{0,5}{3^{6},4}	Pentellated 8-orthoplex Small terated diacosipentacontahexazetton (setek)							134400	10752
20		t_{1,5}{3^{6},4}	Bistericated 8-orthoplex Small bicellated diacosipentacontahexazetton (sibcak)							322560	26880
21		t_{2,5}{4,3^{6}}	Triruncinated 8-cube Small triprismato-octeractidiacosipentacontahexazetton (sitpoke)							376320	35840
22		t_{2,4}{4,3^{6}}	Tricantellated 8-cube Small trirhombated octeract (satro)							215040	26880
23		t_{2,3}{4,3^{6}}	Tritruncated 8-cube Tritruncated octeract (tato)							48384	10752
24		t_{0,6}{3^{6},4}	Hexicated 8-orthoplex Small petated diacosipentacontahexazetton (supek)							64512	7168
25		t_{1,6}{4,3^{6}}	Bipentellated 8-cube Small biteri-octeractidiacosipentacontahexazetton (sabtoke)							215040	21504
26		t_{1,5}{4,3^{6}}	Bistericated 8-cube Small bicellated octeract (sobco)							358400	35840
27		t_{1,4}{4,3^{6}}	Biruncinated 8-cube Small biprismated octeract (sabepo)							322560	35840
28		t_{1,3}{4,3^{6}}	Bicantellated 8-cube Small birhombated octeract (subro)							150528	21504
29		t_{1,2}{4,3^{6}}	Bitruncated 8-cube Bitruncated octeract (bato)							28672	7168
30		t_{0,7}{4,3^{6}}	Heptellated 8-cube Small exi-octeractidiacosipentacontahexazetton (saxoke)							14336	2048
31		t_{0,6}{4,3^{6}}	Hexicated 8-cube Small petated octeract (supo)							64512	7168
32		t_{0,5}{4,3^{6}}	Pentellated 8-cube Small terated octeract (soto)							143360	14336
33		t_{0,4}{4,3^{6}}	Stericated 8-cube Small cellated octeract (soco)							179200	17920
34		t_{0,3}{4,3^{6}}	Runcinated 8-cube Small prismated octeract (sopo)							129024	14336
35		t_{0,2}{4,3^{6}}	Cantellated 8-cube Small rhombated octeract (soro)							50176	7168
36		t_{0,1}{4,3^{6}}	Truncated 8-cube Truncated octeract (tocto)							8192	2048
37		t_{0,1,2}{3^{6},4}	Cantitruncated 8-orthoplex Great rhombated diacosipentacontahexazetton							16128	2688
38		t_{0,1,3}{3^{6},4}	Runcitruncated 8-orthoplex Prismatotruncated diacosipentacontahexazetton							127680	13440
39		t_{0,2,3}{3^{6},4}	Runcicantellated 8-orthoplex Prismatorhombated diacosipentacontahexazetton							80640	13440
40		t_{1,2,3}{3^{6},4}	Bicantitruncated 8-orthoplex Great birhombated diacosipentacontahexazetton							73920	13440
41		t_{0,1,4}{3^{6},4}	Steritruncated 8-orthoplex Cellitruncated diacosipentacontahexazetton							394240	35840
42		t_{0,2,4}{3^{6},4}	Stericantellated 8-orthoplex Cellirhombated diacosipentacontahexazetton							483840	53760
43		t_{1,2,4}{3^{6},4}	Biruncitruncated 8-orthoplex Biprismatotruncated diacosipentacontahexazetton							430080	53760
44		t_{0,3,4}{3^{6},4}	Steriruncinated 8-orthoplex Celliprismated diacosipentacontahexazetton							215040	35840
45		t_{1,3,4}{3^{6},4}	Biruncicantellated 8-orthoplex Biprismatorhombated diacosipentacontahexazetton							322560	53760
46		t_{2,3,4}{3^{6},4}	Tricantitruncated 8-orthoplex Great trirhombated diacosipentacontahexazetton							179200	35840
47		t_{0,1,5}{3^{6},4}	Pentitruncated 8-orthoplex Teritruncated diacosipentacontahexazetton							564480	53760
48		t_{0,2,5}{3^{6},4}	Penticantellated 8-orthoplex Terirhombated diacosipentacontahexazetton							1075200	107520
49		t_{1,2,5}{3^{6},4}	Bisteritruncated 8-orthoplex Bicellitruncated diacosipentacontahexazetton							913920	107520
50		t_{0,3,5}{3^{6},4}	Pentiruncinated 8-orthoplex Teriprismated diacosipentacontahexazetton							913920	107520
51		t_{1,3,5}{3^{6},4}	Bistericantellated 8-orthoplex Bicellirhombated diacosipentacontahexazetton							1290240	161280
52		t_{2,3,5}{3^{6},4}	Triruncitruncated 8-orthoplex Triprismatotruncated diacosipentacontahexazetton							698880	107520
53		t_{0,4,5}{3^{6},4}	Pentistericated 8-orthoplex Tericellated diacosipentacontahexazetton							322560	53760
54		t_{1,4,5}{3^{6},4}	Bisteriruncinated 8-orthoplex Bicelliprismated diacosipentacontahexazetton							698880	107520
55		t_{2,3,5}{4,3^{6}}	Triruncitruncated 8-cube Triprismatotruncated octeract							645120	107520
56		t_{2,3,4}{4,3^{6}}	Tricantitruncated 8-cube Great trirhombated octeract							241920	53760
57		t_{0,1,6}{3^{6},4}	Hexitruncated 8-orthoplex Petitruncated diacosipentacontahexazetton							344064	43008
58		t_{0,2,6}{3^{6},4}	Hexicantellated 8-orthoplex Petirhombated diacosipentacontahexazetton							967680	107520
59		t_{1,2,6}{3^{6},4}	Bipentitruncated 8-orthoplex Biteritruncated diacosipentacontahexazetton							752640	107520
60		t_{0,3,6}{3^{6},4}	Hexiruncinated 8-orthoplex Petiprismated diacosipentacontahexazetton							1290240	143360
61		t_{1,3,6}{3^{6},4}	Bipenticantellated 8-orthoplex Biterirhombated diacosipentacontahexazetton							1720320	215040
62		t_{1,4,5}{4,3^{6}}	Bisteriruncinated 8-cube Bicelliprismated octeract							860160	143360
63		t_{0,4,6}{3^{6},4}	Hexistericated 8-orthoplex Peticellated diacosipentacontahexazetton							860160	107520
64		t_{1,3,6}{4,3^{6}}	Bipenticantellated 8-cube Biterirhombated octeract							1720320	215040
65		t_{1,3,5}{4,3^{6}}	Bistericantellated 8-cube Bicellirhombated octeract							1505280	215040
66		t_{1,3,4}{4,3^{6}}	Biruncicantellated 8-cube Biprismatorhombated octeract							537600	107520
67		t_{0,5,6}{3^{6},4}	Hexipentellated 8-orthoplex Petiterated diacosipentacontahexazetton							258048	43008
68		t_{1,2,6}{4,3^{6}}	Bipentitruncated 8-cube Biteritruncated octeract							752640	107520
69		t_{1,2,5}{4,3^{6}}	Bisteritruncated 8-cube Bicellitruncated octeract							1003520	143360
70		t_{1,2,4}{4,3^{6}}	Biruncitruncated 8-cube Biprismatotruncated octeract							645120	107520
71		t_{1,2,3}{4,3^{6}}	Bicantitruncated 8-cube Great birhombated octeract							172032	43008
72		t_{0,1,7}{3^{6},4}	Heptitruncated 8-orthoplex Exitruncated diacosipentacontahexazetton							93184	14336
73		t_{0,2,7}{3^{6},4}	Hepticantellated 8-orthoplex Exirhombated diacosipentacontahexazetton							365568	43008
74		t_{0,5,6}{4,3^{6}}	Hexipentellated 8-cube Petiterated octeract							258048	43008
75		t_{0,3,7}{3^{6},4}	Heptiruncinated 8-orthoplex Exiprismated diacosipentacontahexazetton							680960	71680
76		t_{0,4,6}{4,3^{6}}	Hexistericated 8-cube Peticellated octeract							860160	107520
77		t_{0,4,5}{4,3^{6}}	Pentistericated 8-cube Tericellated octeract							394240	71680
78		t_{0,3,7}{4,3^{6}}	Heptiruncinated 8-cube Exiprismated octeract							680960	71680
79		t_{0,3,6}{4,3^{6}}	Hexiruncinated 8-cube Petiprismated octeract							1290240	143360
80		t_{0,3,5}{4,3^{6}}	Pentiruncinated 8-cube Teriprismated octeract							1075200	143360
81		t_{0,3,4}{4,3^{6}}	Steriruncinated 8-cube Celliprismated octeract							358400	71680
82		t_{0,2,7}{4,3^{6}}	Hepticantellated 8-cube Exirhombated octeract							365568	43008
83		t_{0,2,6}{4,3^{6}}	Hexicantellated 8-cube Petirhombated octeract							967680	107520
84		t_{0,2,5}{4,3^{6}}	Penticantellated 8-cube Terirhombated octeract							1218560	143360
85		t_{0,2,4}{4,3^{6}}	Stericantellated 8-cube Cellirhombated octeract							752640	107520
86		t_{0,2,3}{4,3^{6}}	Runcicantellated 8-cube Prismatorhombated octeract							193536	43008
87		t_{0,1,7}{4,3^{6}}	Heptitruncated 8-cube Exitruncated octeract							93184	14336
88		t_{0,1,6}{4,3^{6}}	Hexitruncated 8-cube Petitruncated octeract							344064	43008
89		t_{0,1,5}{4,3^{6}}	Pentitruncated 8-cube Teritruncated octeract							609280	71680
90		t_{0,1,4}{4,3^{6}}	Steritruncated 8-cube Cellitruncated octeract							573440	71680
91		t_{0,1,3}{4,3^{6}}	Runcitruncated 8-cube Prismatotruncated octeract							279552	43008
92		t_{0,1,2}{4,3^{6}}	Cantitruncated 8-cube Great rhombated octeract							57344	14336
93		t_{0,1,2,3}{3^{6},4}	Runcicantitruncated 8-orthoplex Great prismated diacosipentacontahexazetton							147840	26880
94		t_{0,1,2,4}{3^{6},4}	Stericantitruncated 8-orthoplex Celligreatorhombated diacosipentacontahexazetton							860160	107520
95		t_{0,1,3,4}{3^{6},4}	Steriruncitruncated 8-orthoplex Celliprismatotruncated diacosipentacontahexazetton							591360	107520
96		t_{0,2,3,4}{3^{6},4}	Steriruncicantellated 8-orthoplex Celliprismatorhombated diacosipentacontahexazetton							591360	107520
97		t_{1,2,3,4}{3^{6},4}	Biruncicantitruncated 8-orthoplex Great biprismated diacosipentacontahexazetton							537600	107520
98		t_{0,1,2,5}{3^{6},4}	Penticantitruncated 8-orthoplex Terigreatorhombated diacosipentacontahexazetton							1827840	215040
99		t_{0,1,3,5}{3^{6},4}	Pentiruncitruncated 8-orthoplex Teriprismatotruncated diacosipentacontahexazetton							2419200	322560
100		t_{0,2,3,5}{3^{6},4}	Pentiruncicantellated 8-orthoplex Teriprismatorhombated diacosipentacontahexazetton							2257920	322560
101		t_{1,2,3,5}{3^{6},4}	Bistericantitruncated 8-orthoplex Bicelligreatorhombated diacosipentacontahexazetton							2096640	322560
102		t_{0,1,4,5}{3^{6},4}	Pentisteritruncated 8-orthoplex Tericellitruncated diacosipentacontahexazetton							1182720	215040
103		t_{0,2,4,5}{3^{6},4}	Pentistericantellated 8-orthoplex Tericellirhombated diacosipentacontahexazetton							1935360	322560
104		t_{1,2,4,5}{3^{6},4}	Bisteriruncitruncated 8-orthoplex Bicelliprismatotruncated diacosipentacontahexazetton							1612800	322560
105		t_{0,3,4,5}{3^{6},4}	Pentisteriruncinated 8-orthoplex Tericelliprismated diacosipentacontahexazetton							1182720	215040
106		t_{1,3,4,5}{3^{6},4}	Bisteriruncicantellated 8-orthoplex Bicelliprismatorhombated diacosipentacontahexazetton							1774080	322560
107		t_{2,3,4,5}{4,3^{6}}	Triruncicantitruncated 8-cube Great triprismato-octeractidiacosipentacontahexazetton							967680	215040
108		t_{0,1,2,6}{3^{6},4}	Hexicantitruncated 8-orthoplex Petigreatorhombated diacosipentacontahexazetton							1505280	215040
109		t_{0,1,3,6}{3^{6},4}	Hexiruncitruncated 8-orthoplex Petiprismatotruncated diacosipentacontahexazetton							3225600	430080
110		t_{0,2,3,6}{3^{6},4}	Hexiruncicantellated 8-orthoplex Petiprismatorhombated diacosipentacontahexazetton							2795520	430080
111		t_{1,2,3,6}{3^{6},4}	Bipenticantitruncated 8-orthoplex Biterigreatorhombated diacosipentacontahexazetton							2580480	430080
112		t_{0,1,4,6}{3^{6},4}	Hexisteritruncated 8-orthoplex Peticellitruncated diacosipentacontahexazetton							3010560	430080
113		t_{0,2,4,6}{3^{6},4}	Hexistericantellated 8-orthoplex Peticellirhombated diacosipentacontahexazetton							4515840	645120
114		t_{1,2,4,6}{3^{6},4}	Bipentiruncitruncated 8-orthoplex Biteriprismatotruncated diacosipentacontahexazetton							3870720	645120
115		t_{0,3,4,6}{3^{6},4}	Hexisteriruncinated 8-orthoplex Peticelliprismated diacosipentacontahexazetton							2580480	430080
116		t_{1,3,4,6}{4,3^{6}}	Bipentiruncicantellated 8-cube Biteriprismatorhombi-octeractidiacosipentacontahexazetton							3870720	645120
117		t_{1,3,4,5}{4,3^{6}}	Bisteriruncicantellated 8-cube Bicelliprismatorhombated octeract							2150400	430080
118		t_{0,1,5,6}{3^{6},4}	Hexipentitruncated 8-orthoplex Petiteritruncated diacosipentacontahexazetton							1182720	215040
119		t_{0,2,5,6}{3^{6},4}	Hexipenticantellated 8-orthoplex Petiterirhombated diacosipentacontahexazetton							2795520	430080
120		t_{1,2,5,6}{4,3^{6}}	Bipentisteritruncated 8-cube Bitericellitrunki-octeractidiacosipentacontahexazetton							2150400	430080
121		t_{0,3,5,6}{3^{6},4}	Hexipentiruncinated 8-orthoplex Petiteriprismated diacosipentacontahexazetton							2795520	430080
122		t_{1,2,4,6}{4,3^{6}}	Bipentiruncitruncated 8-cube Biteriprismatotruncated octeract							3870720	645120
123		t_{1,2,4,5}{4,3^{6}}	Bisteriruncitruncated 8-cube Bicelliprismatotruncated octeract							1935360	430080
124		t_{0,4,5,6}{3^{6},4}	Hexipentistericated 8-orthoplex Petitericellated diacosipentacontahexazetton							1182720	215040
125		t_{1,2,3,6}{4,3^{6}}	Bipenticantitruncated 8-cube Biterigreatorhombated octeract							2580480	430080
126		t_{1,2,3,5}{4,3^{6}}	Bistericantitruncated 8-cube Bicelligreatorhombated octeract							2365440	430080
127		t_{1,2,3,4}{4,3^{6}}	Biruncicantitruncated 8-cube Great biprismated octeract							860160	215040
128		t_{0,1,2,7}{3^{6},4}	Hepticantitruncated 8-orthoplex Exigreatorhombated diacosipentacontahexazetton							516096	86016
129		t_{0,1,3,7}{3^{6},4}	Heptiruncitruncated 8-orthoplex Exiprismatotruncated diacosipentacontahexazetton							1612800	215040
130		t_{0,2,3,7}{3^{6},4}	Heptiruncicantellated 8-orthoplex Exiprismatorhombated diacosipentacontahexazetton							1290240	215040
131		t_{0,4,5,6}{4,3^{6}}	Hexipentistericated 8-cube Petitericellated octeract							1182720	215040
132		t_{0,1,4,7}{3^{6},4}	Heptisteritruncated 8-orthoplex Exicellitruncated diacosipentacontahexazetton							2293760	286720
133		t_{0,2,4,7}{3^{6},4}	Heptistericantellated 8-orthoplex Exicellirhombated diacosipentacontahexazetton							3225600	430080
134		t_{0,3,5,6}{4,3^{6}}	Hexipentiruncinated 8-cube Petiteriprismated octeract							2795520	430080
135		t_{0,3,4,7}{4,3^{6}}	Heptisteriruncinated 8-cube Exicelliprismato-octeractidiacosipentacontahexazetton							1720320	286720
136		t_{0,3,4,6}{4,3^{6}}	Hexisteriruncinated 8-cube Peticelliprismated octeract							2580480	430080
137		t_{0,3,4,5}{4,3^{6}}	Pentisteriruncinated 8-cube Tericelliprismated octeract							1433600	286720
138		t_{0,1,5,7}{3^{6},4}	Heptipentitruncated 8-orthoplex Exiteritruncated diacosipentacontahexazetton							1612800	215040
139		t_{0,2,5,7}{4,3^{6}}	Heptipenticantellated 8-cube Exiterirhombi-octeractidiacosipentacontahexazetton							3440640	430080
140		t_{0,2,5,6}{4,3^{6}}	Hexipenticantellated 8-cube Petiterirhombated octeract							2795520	430080
141		t_{0,2,4,7}{4,3^{6}}	Heptistericantellated 8-cube Exicellirhombated octeract							3225600	430080
142		t_{0,2,4,6}{4,3^{6}}	Hexistericantellated 8-cube Peticellirhombated octeract							4515840	645120
143		t_{0,2,4,5}{4,3^{6}}	Pentistericantellated 8-cube Tericellirhombated octeract							2365440	430080
144		t_{0,2,3,7}{4,3^{6}}	Heptiruncicantellated 8-cube Exiprismatorhombated octeract							1290240	215040
145		t_{0,2,3,6}{4,3^{6}}	Hexiruncicantellated 8-cube Petiprismatorhombated octeract							2795520	430080
146		t_{0,2,3,5}{4,3^{6}}	Pentiruncicantellated 8-cube Teriprismatorhombated octeract							2580480	430080
147		t_{0,2,3,4}{4,3^{6}}	Steriruncicantellated 8-cube Celliprismatorhombated octeract							967680	215040
148		t_{0,1,6,7}{4,3^{6}}	Heptihexitruncated 8-cube Exipetitrunki-octeractidiacosipentacontahexazetton							516096	86016
149		t_{0,1,5,7}{4,3^{6}}	Heptipentitruncated 8-cube Exiteritruncated octeract							1612800	215040
150		t_{0,1,5,6}{4,3^{6}}	Hexipentitruncated 8-cube Petiteritruncated octeract							1182720	215040
151		t_{0,1,4,7}{4,3^{6}}	Heptisteritruncated 8-cube Exicellitruncated octeract							2293760	286720
152		t_{0,1,4,6}{4,3^{6}}	Hexisteritruncated 8-cube Peticellitruncated octeract							3010560	430080
153		t_{0,1,4,5}{4,3^{6}}	Pentisteritruncated 8-cube Tericellitruncated octeract							1433600	286720
154		t_{0,1,3,7}{4,3^{6}}	Heptiruncitruncated 8-cube Exiprismatotruncated octeract							1612800	215040
155		t_{0,1,3,6}{4,3^{6}}	Hexiruncitruncated 8-cube Petiprismatotruncated octeract							3225600	430080
156		t_{0,1,3,5}{4,3^{6}}	Pentiruncitruncated 8-cube Teriprismatotruncated octeract							2795520	430080
157		t_{0,1,3,4}{4,3^{6}}	Steriruncitruncated 8-cube Celliprismatotruncated octeract							967680	215040
158		t_{0,1,2,7}{4,3^{6}}	Hepticantitruncated 8-cube Exigreatorhombated octeract							516096	86016
159		t_{0,1,2,6}{4,3^{6}}	Hexicantitruncated 8-cube Petigreatorhombated octeract							1505280	215040
160		t_{0,1,2,5}{4,3^{6}}	Penticantitruncated 8-cube Terigreatorhombated octeract							2007040	286720
161		t_{0,1,2,4}{4,3^{6}}	Stericantitruncated 8-cube Celligreatorhombated octeract							1290240	215040
162		t_{0,1,2,3}{4,3^{6}}	Runcicantitruncated 8-cube Great prismated octeract							344064	86016
163		t_{0,1,2,3,4}{3^{6},4}	Steriruncicantitruncated 8-orthoplex Great cellated diacosipentacontahexazetton							1075200	215040
164		t_{0,1,2,3,5}{3^{6},4}	Pentiruncicantitruncated 8-orthoplex Terigreatoprismated diacosipentacontahexazetton							4193280	645120
165		t_{0,1,2,4,5}{3^{6},4}	Pentistericantitruncated 8-orthoplex Tericelligreatorhombated diacosipentacontahexazetton							3225600	645120
166		t_{0,1,3,4,5}{3^{6},4}	Pentisteriruncitruncated 8-orthoplex Tericelliprismatotruncated diacosipentacontahexazetton							3225600	645120
167		t_{0,2,3,4,5}{3^{6},4}	Pentisteriruncicantellated 8-orthoplex Tericelliprismatorhombated diacosipentacontahexazetton							3225600	645120
168		t_{1,2,3,4,5}{3^{6},4}	Bisteriruncicantitruncated 8-orthoplex Great bicellated diacosipentacontahexazetton							2903040	645120
169		t_{0,1,2,3,6}{3^{6},4}	Hexiruncicantitruncated 8-orthoplex Petigreatoprismated diacosipentacontahexazetton							5160960	860160
170		t_{0,1,2,4,6}{3^{6},4}	Hexistericantitruncated 8-orthoplex Peticelligreatorhombated diacosipentacontahexazetton							7741440	1290240
171		t_{0,1,3,4,6}{3^{6},4}	Hexisteriruncitruncated 8-orthoplex Peticelliprismatotruncated diacosipentacontahexazetton							7096320	1290240
172		t_{0,2,3,4,6}{3^{6},4}	Hexisteriruncicantellated 8-orthoplex Peticelliprismatorhombated diacosipentacontahexazetton							7096320	1290240
173		t_{1,2,3,4,6}{3^{6},4}	Bipentiruncicantitruncated 8-orthoplex Biterigreatoprismated diacosipentacontahexazetton							6451200	1290240
174		t_{0,1,2,5,6}{3^{6},4}	Hexipenticantitruncated 8-orthoplex Petiterigreatorhombated diacosipentacontahexazetton							4300800	860160
175		t_{0,1,3,5,6}{3^{6},4}	Hexipentiruncitruncated 8-orthoplex Petiteriprismatotruncated diacosipentacontahexazetton							7096320	1290240
176		t_{0,2,3,5,6}{3^{6},4}	Hexipentiruncicantellated 8-orthoplex Petiteriprismatorhombated diacosipentacontahexazetton							6451200	1290240
177		t_{1,2,3,5,6}{3^{6},4}	Bipentistericantitruncated 8-orthoplex Bitericelligreatorhombated diacosipentacontahexazetton							5806080	1290240
178		t_{0,1,4,5,6}{3^{6},4}	Hexipentisteritruncated 8-orthoplex Petitericellitruncated diacosipentacontahexazetton							4300800	860160
179		t_{0,2,4,5,6}{3^{6},4}	Hexipentistericantellated 8-orthoplex Petitericellirhombated diacosipentacontahexazetton							7096320	1290240
180		t_{1,2,3,5,6}{4,3^{6}}	Bipentistericantitruncated 8-cube Bitericelligreatorhombated octeract							5806080	1290240
181		t_{0,3,4,5,6}{3^{6},4}	Hexipentisteriruncinated 8-orthoplex Petitericelliprismated diacosipentacontahexazetton							4300800	860160
182		t_{1,2,3,4,6}{4,3^{6}}	Bipentiruncicantitruncated 8-cube Biterigreatoprismated octeract							6451200	1290240
183		t_{1,2,3,4,5}{4,3^{6}}	Bisteriruncicantitruncated 8-cube Great bicellated octeract							3440640	860160
184		t_{0,1,2,3,7}{3^{6},4}	Heptiruncicantitruncated 8-orthoplex Exigreatoprismated diacosipentacontahexazetton							2365440	430080
185		t_{0,1,2,4,7}{3^{6},4}	Heptistericantitruncated 8-orthoplex Exicelligreatorhombated diacosipentacontahexazetton							5591040	860160
186		t_{0,1,3,4,7}{3^{6},4}	Heptisteriruncitruncated 8-orthoplex Exicelliprismatotruncated diacosipentacontahexazetton							4730880	860160
187		t_{0,2,3,4,7}{3^{6},4}	Heptisteriruncicantellated 8-orthoplex Exicelliprismatorhombated diacosipentacontahexazetton							4730880	860160
188		t_{0,3,4,5,6}{4,3^{6}}	Hexipentisteriruncinated 8-cube Petitericelliprismated octeract							4300800	860160
189		t_{0,1,2,5,7}{3^{6},4}	Heptipenticantitruncated 8-orthoplex Exiterigreatorhombated diacosipentacontahexazetton							5591040	860160
190		t_{0,1,3,5,7}{3^{6},4}	Heptipentiruncitruncated 8-orthoplex Exiteriprismatotruncated diacosipentacontahexazetton							8386560	1290240
191		t_{0,2,3,5,7}{3^{6},4}	Heptipentiruncicantellated 8-orthoplex Exiteriprismatorhombated diacosipentacontahexazetton							7741440	1290240
192		t_{0,2,4,5,6}{4,3^{6}}	Hexipentistericantellated 8-cube Petitericellirhombated octeract							7096320	1290240
193		t_{0,1,4,5,7}{3^{6},4}	Heptipentisteritruncated 8-orthoplex Exitericellitruncated diacosipentacontahexazetton							4730880	860160
194		t_{0,2,3,5,7}{4,3^{6}}	Heptipentiruncicantellated 8-cube Exiteriprismatorhombated octeract							7741440	1290240
195		t_{0,2,3,5,6}{4,3^{6}}	Hexipentiruncicantellated 8-cube Petiteriprismatorhombated octeract							6451200	1290240
196		t_{0,2,3,4,7}{4,3^{6}}	Heptisteriruncicantellated 8-cube Exicelliprismatorhombated octeract							4730880	860160
197		t_{0,2,3,4,6}{4,3^{6}}	Hexisteriruncicantellated 8-cube Peticelliprismatorhombated octeract							7096320	1290240
198		t_{0,2,3,4,5}{4,3^{6}}	Pentisteriruncicantellated 8-cube Tericelliprismatorhombated octeract							3870720	860160
199		t_{0,1,2,6,7}{3^{6},4}	Heptihexicantitruncated 8-orthoplex Exipetigreatorhombated diacosipentacontahexazetton							2365440	430080
200		t_{0,1,3,6,7}{3^{6},4}	Heptihexiruncitruncated 8-orthoplex Exipetiprismatotruncated diacosipentacontahexazetton							5591040	860160
201		t_{0,1,4,5,7}{4,3^{6}}	Heptipentisteritruncated 8-cube Exitericellitruncated octeract							4730880	860160
202		t_{0,1,4,5,6}{4,3^{6}}	Hexipentisteritruncated 8-cube Petitericellitruncated octeract							4300800	860160
203		t_{0,1,3,6,7}{4,3^{6}}	Heptihexiruncitruncated 8-cube Exipetiprismatotruncated octeract							5591040	860160
204		t_{0,1,3,5,7}{4,3^{6}}	Heptipentiruncitruncated 8-cube Exiteriprismatotruncated octeract							8386560	1290240
205		t_{0,1,3,5,6}{4,3^{6}}	Hexipentiruncitruncated 8-cube Petiteriprismatotruncated octeract							7096320	1290240
206		t_{0,1,3,4,7}{4,3^{6}}	Heptisteriruncitruncated 8-cube Exicelliprismatotruncated octeract							4730880	860160
207		t_{0,1,3,4,6}{4,3^{6}}	Hexisteriruncitruncated 8-cube Peticelliprismatotruncated octeract							7096320	1290240
208		t_{0,1,3,4,5}{4,3^{6}}	Pentisteriruncitruncated 8-cube Tericelliprismatotruncated octeract							3870720	860160
209		t_{0,1,2,6,7}{4,3^{6}}	Heptihexicantitruncated 8-cube Exipetigreatorhombated octeract							2365440	430080
210		t_{0,1,2,5,7}{4,3^{6}}	Heptipenticantitruncated 8-cube Exiterigreatorhombated octeract							5591040	860160
211		t_{0,1,2,5,6}{4,3^{6}}	Hexipenticantitruncated 8-cube Petiterigreatorhombated octeract							4300800	860160
212		t_{0,1,2,4,7}{4,3^{6}}	Heptistericantitruncated 8-cube Exicelligreatorhombated octeract							5591040	860160
213		t_{0,1,2,4,6}{4,3^{6}}	Hexistericantitruncated 8-cube Peticelligreatorhombated octeract							7741440	1290240
214		t_{0,1,2,4,5}{4,3^{6}}	Pentistericantitruncated 8-cube Tericelligreatorhombated octeract							3870720	860160
215		t_{0,1,2,3,7}{4,3^{6}}	Heptiruncicantitruncated 8-cube Exigreatoprismated octeract							2365440	430080
216		t_{0,1,2,3,6}{4,3^{6}}	Hexiruncicantitruncated 8-cube Petigreatoprismated octeract							5160960	860160
217		t_{0,1,2,3,5}{4,3^{6}}	Pentiruncicantitruncated 8-cube Terigreatoprismated octeract							4730880	860160
218		t_{0,1,2,3,4}{4,3^{6}}	Steriruncicantitruncated 8-cube Great cellated octeract							1720320	430080
219		t_{0,1,2,3,4,5}{3^{6},4}	Pentisteriruncicantitruncated 8-orthoplex Great terated diacosipentacontahexazetton							5806080	1290240
220		t_{0,1,2,3,4,6}{3^{6},4}	Hexisteriruncicantitruncated 8-orthoplex Petigreatocellated diacosipentacontahexazetton							12902400	2580480
221		t_{0,1,2,3,5,6}{3^{6},4}	Hexipentiruncicantitruncated 8-orthoplex Petiterigreatoprismated diacosipentacontahexazetton							11612160	2580480
222		t_{0,1,2,4,5,6}{3^{6},4}	Hexipentistericantitruncated 8-orthoplex Petitericelligreatorhombated diacosipentacontahexazetton							11612160	2580480
223		t_{0,1,3,4,5,6}{3^{6},4}	Hexipentisteriruncitruncated 8-orthoplex Petitericelliprismatotruncated diacosipentacontahexazetton							11612160	2580480
224		t_{0,2,3,4,5,6}{3^{6},4}	Hexipentisteriruncicantellated 8-orthoplex Petitericelliprismatorhombated diacosipentacontahexazetton							11612160	2580480
225		t_{1,2,3,4,5,6}{4,3^{6}}	Bipentisteriruncicantitruncated 8-cube Great biteri-octeractidiacosipentacontahexazetton							10321920	2580480
226		t_{0,1,2,3,4,7}{3^{6},4}	Heptisteriruncicantitruncated 8-orthoplex Exigreatocellated diacosipentacontahexazetton							8601600	1720320
227		t_{0,1,2,3,5,7}{3^{6},4}	Heptipentiruncicantitruncated 8-orthoplex Exiterigreatoprismated diacosipentacontahexazetton							14192640	2580480
228		t_{0,1,2,4,5,7}{3^{6},4}	Heptipentistericantitruncated 8-orthoplex Exitericelligreatorhombated diacosipentacontahexazetton							12902400	2580480
229		t_{0,1,3,4,5,7}{3^{6},4}	Heptipentisteriruncitruncated 8-orthoplex Exitericelliprismatotruncated diacosipentacontahexazetton							12902400	2580480
230		t_{0,2,3,4,5,7}{4,3^{6}}	Heptipentisteriruncicantellated 8-cube Exitericelliprismatorhombi-octeractidiacosipentacontahexazetton							12902400	2580480
231		t_{0,2,3,4,5,6}{4,3^{6}}	Hexipentisteriruncicantellated 8-cube Petitericelliprismatorhombated octeract							11612160	2580480
232		t_{0,1,2,3,6,7}{3^{6},4}	Heptihexiruncicantitruncated 8-orthoplex Exipetigreatoprismated diacosipentacontahexazetton							8601600	1720320
233		t_{0,1,2,4,6,7}{3^{6},4}	Heptihexistericantitruncated 8-orthoplex Exipeticelligreatorhombated diacosipentacontahexazetton							14192640	2580480
234		t_{0,1,3,4,6,7}{4,3^{6}}	Heptihexisteriruncitruncated 8-cube Exipeticelliprismatotrunki-octeractidiacosipentacontahexazetton							12902400	2580480
235		t_{0,1,3,4,5,7}{4,3^{6}}	Heptipentisteriruncitruncated 8-cube Exitericelliprismatotruncated octeract							12902400	2580480
236		t_{0,1,3,4,5,6}{4,3^{6}}	Hexipentisteriruncitruncated 8-cube Petitericelliprismatotruncated octeract							11612160	2580480
237		t_{0,1,2,5,6,7}{4,3^{6}}	Heptihexipenticantitruncated 8-cube Exipetiterigreatorhombi-octeractidiacosipentacontahexazetton							8601600	1720320
238		t_{0,1,2,4,6,7}{4,3^{6}}	Heptihexistericantitruncated 8-cube Exipeticelligreatorhombated octeract							14192640	2580480
239		t_{0,1,2,4,5,7}{4,3^{6}}	Heptipentistericantitruncated 8-cube Exitericelligreatorhombated octeract							12902400	2580480
240		t_{0,1,2,4,5,6}{4,3^{6}}	Hexipentistericantitruncated 8-cube Petitericelligreatorhombated octeract							11612160	2580480
241		t_{0,1,2,3,6,7}{4,3^{6}}	Heptihexiruncicantitruncated 8-cube Exipetigreatoprismated octeract							8601600	1720320
242		t_{0,1,2,3,5,7}{4,3^{6}}	Heptipentiruncicantitruncated 8-cube Exiterigreatoprismated octeract							14192640	2580480
243		t_{0,1,2,3,5,6}{4,3^{6}}	Hexipentiruncicantitruncated 8-cube Petiterigreatoprismated octeract							11612160	2580480
244		t_{0,1,2,3,4,7}{4,3^{6}}	Heptisteriruncicantitruncated 8-cube Exigreatocellated octeract							8601600	1720320
245		t_{0,1,2,3,4,6}{4,3^{6}}	Hexisteriruncicantitruncated 8-cube Petigreatocellated octeract							12902400	2580480
246		t_{0,1,2,3,4,5}{4,3^{6}}	Pentisteriruncicantitruncated 8-cube Great terated octeract							6881280	1720320
247		t_{0,1,2,3,4,5,6}{3^{6},4}	Hexipentisteriruncicantitruncated 8-orthoplex Great petated diacosipentacontahexazetton							20643840	5160960
248		t_{0,1,2,3,4,5,7}{3^{6},4}	Heptipentisteriruncicantitruncated 8-orthoplex Exigreatoterated diacosipentacontahexazetton							23224320	5160960
249		t_{0,1,2,3,4,6,7}{3^{6},4}	Heptihexisteriruncicantitruncated 8-orthoplex Exipetigreatocellated diacosipentacontahexazetton							23224320	5160960
250		t_{0,1,2,3,5,6,7}{3^{6},4}	Heptihexipentiruncicantitruncated 8-orthoplex Exipetiterigreatoprismated diacosipentacontahexazetton							23224320	5160960
251		t_{0,1,2,3,5,6,7}{4,3^{6}}	Heptihexipentiruncicantitruncated 8-cube Exipetiterigreatoprismated octeract							23224320	5160960
252		t_{0,1,2,3,4,6,7}{4,3^{6}}	Heptihexisteriruncicantitruncated 8-cube Exipetigreatocellated octeract							23224320	5160960
253		t_{0,1,2,3,4,5,7}{4,3^{6}}	Heptipentisteriruncicantitruncated 8-cube Exigreatoterated octeract							23224320	5160960
254		t_{0,1,2,3,4,5,6}{4,3^{6}}	Hexipentisteriruncicantitruncated 8-cube Great petated octeract							20643840	5160960
255		t_{0,1,2,3,4,5,6,7}{4,3^{6}}	Omnitruncated 8-cube Great exi-octeractidiacosipentacontahexazetton							41287680	10321920

=== The D_{8} family ===
The D_{8} family has symmetry of order 5,160,960 (8 factorial × 2^{7}).

This family has 191 Wythoffian uniform polytopes, from 3 × 64 − 1 permutations of the D_{8} Coxeter-Dynkin diagram with one or more rings. 127 (2 × 64 − 1) are repeated from the B_{8} family and 64 are unique to this family, all listed below.

See list of D8 polytopes for Coxeter plane graphs of these polytopes.

D_{8} uniform polytopes
#	Coxeter-Dynkin diagram	Name (acronym) Schläfli symbol	Base point (Alternately signed)	Element counts								Circumrad
#	Coxeter-Dynkin diagram	Name (acronym) Schläfli symbol	Base point (Alternately signed)	7	6	5	4	3	2	1	0	Circumrad
1	=	8-demicube (hocto) h{4,3,3,3,3,3,3}	(1,1,1,1,1,1,1,1)	144	1136	4032	8288	10752	7168	1792	128	1.0000000
2	=	Cantic 8-cube (thocto) h_{2}{4,3,3,3,3,3,3}	(1,1,3,3,3,3,3,3)							23296	3584	2.6457512
3	=	Runcic 8-cube (sreho) h_{3}{4,3,3,3,3,3,3}	(1,1,1,3,3,3,3,3)							64512	7168	2.4494896
4	=	Steric 8-cube (sapho) h_{4}{4,3,3,3,3,3,3}	(1,1,1,1,3,3,3,3)							98560	8960	2.2360678
5	=	Pentic 8-cube (sacho) h_{5}{4,3,3,3,3,3,3}	(1,1,1,1,1,3,3,3)							89600	7168	1.9999999
6	=	Hexic 8-cube (sotho) h_{6}{4,3,3,3,3,3,3}	(1,1,1,1,1,1,3,3)							48384	3584	1.7320508
7	=	Heptic 8-cube (spuho) h_{7}{4,3,3,3,3,3,3}	(1,1,1,1,1,1,1,3)							14336	1024	1.4142135
8	=	Runcicantic 8-cube (garho) h_{2,3}{4,3,3,3,3,3,3}	(1,1,3,5,5,5,5,5)							86016	21504	4.1231055
9	=	Stericantic 8-cube (petho) h_{2,4}{4,3,3,3,3,3,3}	(1,1,3,3,5,5,5,5)							349440	53760	3.8729835
10	=	Steriruncic 8-cube (preho) h_{3,4}{4,3,3,3,3,3,3}	(1,1,1,3,5,5,5,5)							179200	35840	3.7416575
11	=	Penticantic 8-cube (catho) h_{2,5}{4,3,3,3,3,3,3}	(1,1,3,3,3,5,5,5)							573440	71680	3.6055512
12	=	Pentiruncic 8-cube (craho) h_{3,5}{4,3,3,3,3,3,3}	(1,1,1,3,3,5,5,5)							537600	71680	3.4641016
13	=	Pentisteric 8-cube (cepho) h_{4,5}{4,3,3,3,3,3,3}	(1,1,1,1,3,5,5,5)							232960	35840	3.3166249
14	=	Hexicantic 8-cube (totho) h_{2,6}{4,3,3,3,3,3,3}	(1,1,3,3,3,3,5,5)							456960	53760	3.3166249
15	=	Hexiruncic 8-cube (tarho) h_{3,6}{4,3,3,3,3,3,3}	(1,1,1,3,3,3,5,5)							645120	71680	3.1622777
16	=	Hexisteric 8-cube (tupho) h_{4,6}{4,3,3,3,3,3,3}	(1,1,1,1,3,3,5,5)							483840	53760	3
17	=	Hexipentic 8-cube (tucho) h_{5,6}{4,3,3,3,3,3,3}	(1,1,1,1,1,3,5,5)							182784	21504	2.8284271
18	=	Hepticantic 8-cube (putho) h_{2,7}{4,3,3,3,3,3,3}	(1,1,3,3,3,3,3,5)							172032	21504	3
19	=	Heptiruncic 8-cube (pruho) h_{3,7}{4,3,3,3,3,3,3}	(1,1,1,3,3,3,3,5)							340480	35840	2.8284271
20	=	Heptisteric 8-cube (pupaho) h_{4,7}{4,3,3,3,3,3,3}	(1,1,1,1,3,3,3,5)							376320	35840	2.6457512
21	=	Heptipentic 8-cube (pucho) h_{5,7}{4,3,3,3,3,3,3}	(1,1,1,1,1,3,3,5)							236544	21504	2.4494898
22	=	Heptihexic 8-cube (puteho) h_{6,7}{4,3,3,3,3,3,3}	(1,1,1,1,1,1,3,5)							78848	7168	2.236068
23	=	Steriruncicantic 8-cube (gapho) h_{2,3,4}{4,3^{6}}	(1,1,3,5,7,7,7,7)							430080	107520	5.3851647
24	=	Pentiruncicantic 8-cube (cagreho) h_{2,3,5}{4,3^{6}}	(1,1,3,5,5,7,7,7)							1182720	215040	5.0990195
25	=	Pentistericantic 8-cube (copatho) h_{2,4,5}{4,3^{6}}	(1,1,3,3,5,7,7,7)							1075200	215040	4.8989797
26	=	Pentisteriruncic 8-cube (cepraho) h_{3,4,5}{4,3^{6}}	(1,1,1,3,5,7,7,7)							716800	143360	4.7958317
27	=	Hexiruncicantic 8-cube (tugreho) h_{2,3,6}{4,3^{6}}	(1,1,3,5,5,5,7,7)							1290240	215040	4.7958317
28	=	Hexistericantic 8-cube (tupetho) h_{2,4,6}{4,3^{6}}	(1,1,3,3,5,5,7,7)							2096640	322560	4.5825758
29	=	Hexisteriruncic 8-cube (topreho) h_{3,4,6}{4,3^{6}}	(1,1,1,3,5,5,7,7)							1290240	215040	4.472136
30	=	Hexipenticantic 8-cube (tucatho) h_{2,5,6}{4,3^{6}}	(1,1,3,3,3,5,7,7)							1290240	215040	4.3588991
31	=	Hexipentiruncic 8-cube (tucreho) h_{3,5,6}{4,3^{6}}	(1,1,1,3,3,5,7,7)							1397760	215040	4.2426405
32	=	Hexipentisteric 8-cube (tocapho) h_{4,5,6}{4,3^{6}}	(1,1,1,1,3,5,7,7)							698880	107520	4.1231055
33	=	Heptiruncicantic 8-cube (pugerho) h_{2,3,7}{4,3^{6}}	(1,1,3,5,5,5,5,7)							591360	107520	4.472136
34	=	Heptistericantic 8-cube (pupatho) h_{2,4,7}{4,3^{6}}	(1,1,3,3,5,5,5,7)							1505280	215040	4.2426405
35	=	Heptisteriruncic 8-cube (pupraho) h_{3,4,7}{4,3^{6}}	(1,1,1,3,5,5,5,7)							860160	143360	4.1231055
36	=	Heptipenticantic 8-cube (pucatho) h_{2,5,7}{4,3^{6}}	(1,1,3,3,3,5,5,7)							1612800	215040	4
37	=	Heptipentiruncic 8-cube (pucarho) h_{3,5,7}{4,3^{6}}	(1,1,1,3,3,5,5,7)							1612800	215040	3.8729835
38	=	Heptipentisteric 8-cube (pucapho) h_{4,5,7}{4,3^{6}}	(1,1,1,1,3,5,5,7)							752640	107520	3.7416575
39	=	Heptihexicantic 8-cube (putetho) h_{2,6,7}{4,3^{6}}	(1,1,3,3,3,3,5,7)							752640	107520	3.7416575
40	=	Heptihexiruncic 8-cube (putarho) h_{3,6,7}{4,3^{6}}	(1,1,1,3,3,3,5,7)							1146880	143360	3.6055512
41	=	Heptihexisteric 8-cube (putopho) h_{4,6,7}{4,3^{6}}	(1,1,1,1,3,3,5,7)							913920	107520	3.4641016
42	=	Heptihexipentic 8-cube (potecho) h_{5,6,7}{4,3^{6}}	(1,1,1,1,1,3,5,7)							365568	43008	3.3166249
43	=	Pentisteriruncicantic 8-cube (gacho) h_{2,3,4,5}{4,3^{6}}	(1,1,3,5,7,9,9,9)							1720320	430080	6.4031243
44	=	Hexisteriruncicantic 8-cube (tugepho) h_{2,3,4,6}{4,3^{6}}	(1,1,3,5,7,7,9,9)							3225600	645120	6.0827627
45	=	Hexipentiruncicantic 8-cube (tucagreho) h_{2,3,5,6}{4,3^{6}}	(1,1,3,5,5,7,9,9)							2903040	645120	5.8309517
46	=	Hexipentistericantic 8-cube (tucpetho) h_{2,4,5,6}{4,3^{6}}	(1,1,3,3,5,7,9,9)							3225600	645120	5.6568542
47	=	Hexipentisteriruncic 8-cube (tocparho) h_{3,4,5,6}{4,3^{6}}	(1,1,1,3,5,7,9,9)							2150400	430080	5.5677648
48	=	Heptisteriruncicantic 8-cube (pugapho) h_{2,3,4,7}{4,3^{6}}	(1,1,3,5,7,7,7,9)							2150400	430080	5.7445626
49	=	Heptipentiruncicantic 8-cube (pucgreho) h_{2,3,5,7}{4,3^{6}}	(1,1,3,5,5,7,7,9)							3548160	645120	5.4772258
50	=	Heptipentistericantic 8-cube (pocpatho) h_{2,4,5,7}{4,3^{6}}	(1,1,3,3,5,7,7,9)							3548160	645120	5.291503
51	=	Heptipentisteriruncic 8-cube (pocpreho) h_{3,4,5,7}{4,3^{6}}	(1,1,1,3,5,7,7,9)							2365440	430080	5.1961527
52	=	Heptihexiruncicantic 8-cube (putagreho) h_{2,3,6,7}{4,3^{6}}	(1,1,3,5,5,5,7,9)							2150400	430080	5.1961527
53	=	Heptihexistericantic 8-cube (putapatho) h_{2,4,6,7}{4,3^{6}}	(1,1,3,3,5,5,7,9)							3870720	645120	5
54	=	Heptihexisteriruncic 8-cube (poteparho) h_{3,4,6,7}{4,3^{6}}	(1,1,1,3,5,5,7,9)							2365440	430080	4.8989797
55	=	Heptihexipenticantic 8-cube (potacotho) h_{2,5,6,7}{4,3^{6}}	(1,1,3,3,3,5,7,9)							2580480	430080	4.7958317
56	=	Heptihexipentiruncic 8-cube (potcarho) h_{3,5,6,7}{4,3^{6}}	(1,1,1,3,3,5,7,9)							2795520	430080	4.6904159
57	=	Heptihexipentisteric 8-cube (potcapho) h_{4,5,6,7}{4,3^{6}}	(1,1,1,1,3,5,7,9)							1397760	215040	4.5825758
58	=	Hexipentisteriruncicantic 8-cube (gotho) h_{2,3,4,5,6}{4,3^{6}}	(1,1,3,5,7,9,11,11)							5160960	1290240	7.1414285
59	=	Heptipentisteriruncicantic 8-cube (pugecho) h_{2,3,4,5,7}{4,3^{6}}	(1,1,3,5,7,9,9,11)							5806080	1290240	6.78233
60	=	Heptihexisteriruncicantic 8-cube (potegapho) h_{2,3,4,6,7}{4,3^{6}}	(1,1,3,5,7,7,9,11)							5806080	1290240	6.480741
61	=	Heptihexipentiruncicantic 8-cube (potcograho) h_{2,3,5,6,7}{4,3^{6}}	(1,1,3,5,5,7,9,11)							5806080	1290240	6.244998
62	=	Heptihexipentistericantic 8-cube (potcupetho) h_{2,4,5,6,7}{4,3^{6}}	(1,1,3,3,5,7,9,11)							6451200	1290240	6.0827627
63	=	Heptihexipentisteriruncic 8-cube (potcoparho) h_{3,4,5,6,7}{4,3^{6}}	(1,1,1,3,5,7,9,11)							4300800	860160	6.0000000
64	=	Heptihexipentisteriruncicantic 8-cube (gupho) h_{2,3,4,5,6,7}{4,3^{6}}	(1,1,3,5,7,9,11,13)							2580480	10321920	7.5498347

=== The E_{8} family ===
The E_{8} family has symmetry order 696,729,600.

There are 255 forms based on all permutations of the Coxeter-Dynkin diagrams with one or more rings. Eight forms are shown below, 4 single-ringed, 3 truncations (2 rings), and the final omnitruncation are given below. Bowers-style acronym names are given for cross-referencing.

See also list of E8 polytopes for Coxeter plane graphs of this family.

E_{8} uniform polytopes
#	Coxeter-Dynkin diagram	Names	Element counts							
#	Coxeter-Dynkin diagram	Names	7-faces	6-faces	5-faces	4-faces	Cells	Faces	Edges	Vertices
1		4_{21} (fy)	19440	207360	483840	483840	241920	60480	6720	240
2		Truncated 4_{21} (tiffy)							188160	13440
3		Rectified 4_{21} (riffy)	19680	375840	1935360	3386880	2661120	1028160	181440	6720
4		Birectified 4_{21} (borfy)	19680	382560	2600640	7741440	9918720	5806080	1451520	60480
5		Trirectified 4_{21} (torfy)	19680	382560	2661120	9313920	16934400	14515200	4838400	241920
6		Rectified 1_{42} (buffy)	19680	382560	2661120	9072000	16934400	16934400	7257600	483840
7		Rectified 2_{41} (robay)	19680	313440	1693440	4717440	7257600	5322240	1451520	69120
8		2_{41} (bay)	17520	144960	544320	1209600	1209600	483840	69120	2160
9		Truncated 2_{41}								138240
10		1_{42} (bif)	2400	106080	725760	2298240	3628800	2419200	483840	17280
11		Truncated 1_{42}								967680
12		Omnitruncated 4_{21}								696729600

== Regular and uniform honeycombs ==
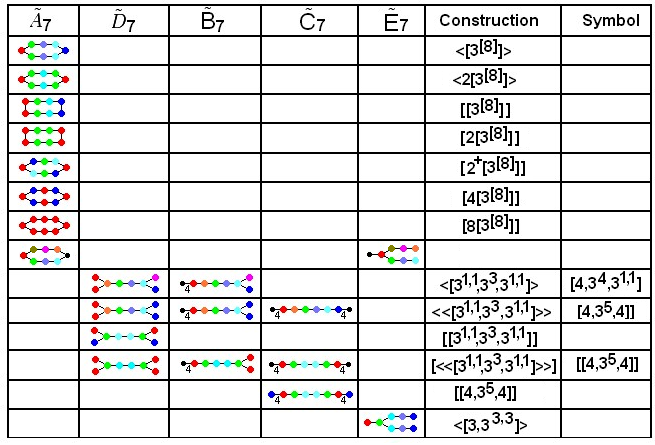
Coxeter-Dynkin diagram correspondences between families and higher symmetry within diagrams. Nodes of the same color in each row represent identical mirrors. Black nodes are not active in the correspondence.

There are five fundamental affine Coxeter groups that generate regular and uniform tessellations in 7-space:

#	Coxeter group		Coxeter diagram	Forms
1	${\tilde{A}}_7$	[3^{[8]}]		29
2	${\tilde{C}}_7$	[4,3^{5},4]		135
3	${\tilde{B}}_7$	[4,3^{4},3^{1,1}]		191 (64 new)
4	${\tilde{D}}_7$	[3^{1,1},3^{3},3^{1,1}]		77 (10 new)
5	${\tilde{E}}_7$	[3^{3,3,1}]		143

Regular and uniform tessellations include:

- ${\tilde{A}}_7$ 29 uniquely ringed forms, including:
  - 7-simplex honeycomb: {3^{[8]}}
- ${\tilde{C}}_7$ 135 uniquely ringed forms, including:
  - Regular 7-cube honeycomb: {4,3^{4},4} = {4,3^{4},3^{1,1}}, =
- ${\tilde{B}}_7$ 191 uniquely ringed forms, 127 shared with ${\tilde{C}}_7$, and 64 new, including:
  - 7-demicube honeycomb: h{4,3^{4},4} = {3^{1,1},3^{4},4}, =
- ${\tilde{D}}_7$, [3^{1,1},3^{3},3^{1,1}]: 77 unique ring permutations, and 10 are new, the first Coxeter called a quarter 7-cubic honeycomb.
  - ,,,,,,,,,
- ${\tilde{E}}_7$ 143 uniquely ringed forms, including:
  - 1_{33} honeycomb: {3,3^{3,3}},
  - 3_{31} honeycomb: {3,3,3,3^{3,1}},

=== Regular and uniform hyperbolic honeycombs ===
There are no compact hyperbolic Coxeter groups of rank 8, groups that can generate honeycombs with all finite facets, and a finite vertex figure. However, there are 4 paracompact hyperbolic Coxeter groups of rank 8, each generating uniform honeycombs in 7-space as permutations of rings of the Coxeter diagrams.

${\bar{P}}_7$ = [3,3^{[7]}]:	${\bar{Q}}_7$ = [3^{1,1},3^{2},3^{2,1}]:	${\bar{S}}_7$ = [4,3^{3},3^{2,1}]:	${\bar{T}}_7$ = [3^{3,2,2}]:

Fundamental convex regular and uniform polytopes in dimensions 2–10
Family	A_{n}	B_{n}	I_{2}(p) / D_{n}	E_{6} / E_{7} / E_{8} / F_{4} / G_{2}	H_{n}
Regular polygon	Triangle	Square	p-gon	Hexagon	Pentagon
Uniform polyhedron	Tetrahedron	Octahedron • Cube	Demicube		Dodecahedron • Icosahedron
Uniform polychoron	Pentachoron	16-cell • Tesseract	Demitesseract	24-cell	120-cell • 600-cell
Uniform 5-polytope	5-simplex	5-orthoplex • 5-cube	5-demicube		
Uniform 6-polytope	6-simplex	6-orthoplex • 6-cube	6-demicube	1_{22} • 2_{21}	
Uniform 7-polytope	7-simplex	7-orthoplex • 7-cube	7-demicube	1_{32} • 2_{31} • 3_{21}	
Uniform 8-polytope	8-simplex	8-orthoplex • 8-cube	8-demicube	1_{42} • 2_{41} • 4_{21}	
Uniform 9-polytope	9-simplex	9-orthoplex • 9-cube	9-demicube		
Uniform 10-polytope	10-simplex	10-orthoplex • 10-cube	10-demicube		
Uniform n-polytope	n-simplex	n-orthoplex • n-cube	n-demicube	1_{k2} • 2_{k1} • k_{21}	n-pentagonal polytope
Topics: Polytope families • Regular polytope • List of regular polytopes and compounds • Polytope operations
