= D6 polytope =

Orthographic projections in the D_{6} Coxeter plane
6-demicube	6-orthoplex

In 6-dimensional geometry, there are 47 uniform polytopes with D_{6} symmetry, of which 16 are unique and 31 are shared with the B_{6} symmetry. There are two regular forms, the 6-orthoplex, and 6-demicube with 12 and 32 vertices respectively.

They can be visualized as symmetric orthographic projections in Coxeter planes of the D_{6} Coxeter group, and other subgroups.

== Graphs ==
Symmetric orthographic projections of these 16 polytopes can be made in the D_{6}, D_{5}, D_{4}, D_{3}, A_{5}, A_{3}, Coxeter planes. A_{k} has [k+1] symmetry, D_{k} has [2(k-1)] symmetry. B_{6} is also included although only half of its [12] symmetry exists in these polytopes.

Each of these 16 polytopes is shown as a projection in the 7 symmetry planes, with vertices and edges drawn, and vertices colored by the number of overlapping vertices in each projective position in progressive order: red, orange, yellow, green, cyan, blue, purple, magenta, red-violet.

#	Coxeter plane graphs							Coxeter diagram Names (acronym)
#	B_{6} [12/2]	D_{6} [10]	D_{5} [8]	D_{4} [6]	D_{3} [4]	A_{5} [6]	A_{3} [4]	Coxeter diagram Names (acronym)
1								= 6-demicube Hemihexeract (hax)
2								= cantic 6-cube Truncated hemihexeract (thax)
3								= runcic 6-cube Small rhombated hemihexeract (sirhax)
4								= steric 6-cube Small prismated hemihexeract (sophax)
5								= pentic 6-cube Small cellated demihexeract (sochax)
6								= runcicantic 6-cube Great rhombated hemihexeract (girhax)
7								= stericantic 6-cube Prismatotruncated hemihexeract (pithax)
8								= steriruncic 6-cube Prismatorhombated hemihexeract (prohax)
9								= Stericantic 6-cube Cellitruncated hemihexeract (cathix)
10								= Pentiruncic 6-cube Cellirhombated hemihexeract (crohax)
11								= Pentisteric 6-cube Celliprismated hemihexeract (cophix)
12								= Steriruncicantic 6-cube Great prismated hemihexeract (gophax)
13								= Pentiruncicantic 6-cube Celligreatorhombated hemihexeract (cagrohax)
14								= Pentistericantic 6-cube Celliprismatotruncated hemihexeract (capthix)
15								= Pentisteriruncic 6-cube Celliprismatorhombated hemihexeract (caprohax)
16								= Pentisteriruncicantic 6-cube Great cellated hemihexeract (gochax)

== Notes ==
Fundamental convex regular and uniform polytopes in dimensions 2–10
Family	A_{n}	B_{n}	I_{2}(p) / D_{n}	E_{6} / E_{7} / E_{8} / F_{4} / G_{2}	H_{n}
Regular polygon	Triangle	Square	p-gon	Hexagon	Pentagon
Uniform polyhedron	Tetrahedron	Octahedron • Cube	Demicube		Dodecahedron • Icosahedron
Uniform polychoron	Pentachoron	16-cell • Tesseract	Demitesseract	24-cell	120-cell • 600-cell
Uniform 5-polytope	5-simplex	5-orthoplex • 5-cube	5-demicube		
Uniform 6-polytope	6-simplex	6-orthoplex • 6-cube	6-demicube	1_{22} • 2_{21}	
Uniform 7-polytope	7-simplex	7-orthoplex • 7-cube	7-demicube	1_{32} • 2_{31} • 3_{21}	
Uniform 8-polytope	8-simplex	8-orthoplex • 8-cube	8-demicube	1_{42} • 2_{41} • 4_{21}	
Uniform 9-polytope	9-simplex	9-orthoplex • 9-cube	9-demicube		
Uniform 10-polytope	10-simplex	10-orthoplex • 10-cube	10-demicube		
Uniform n-polytope	n-simplex	n-orthoplex • n-cube	n-demicube	1_{k2} • 2_{k1} • k_{21}	n-pentagonal polytope
Topics: Polytope families • Regular polytope • List of regular polytopes and compounds • Polytope operations
