= E9 honeycomb =

In geometry, an E_{9} honeycomb is a tessellation of uniform polytopes in hyperbolic 9-dimensional space. ${\bar{T}}_9$, also (E_{10}) is a paracompact hyperbolic group, so either facets or vertex figures will not be bounded.

E_{10} is last of the series of Coxeter groups with a bifurcated Coxeter-Dynkin diagram of lengths 6,2,1. There are 1023 unique E_{10} honeycombs by all combinations of its Coxeter-Dynkin diagram. There are no regular honeycombs in the family since its Coxeter diagram is a nonlinear graph, but there are three simplest ones, with a single ring at the end of its 3 branches: 6_{21}, 2_{61}, 1_{62}.

== 6_{21} honeycomb ==
6_{21} honeycomb
Family	k_{21} polytope
Schläfli symbol	{3,3,3,3,3,3,3^{2,1}}
Coxeter symbol	6_{21}
Coxeter-Dynkin diagram	
9-faces	6_{11}, {3^{8}}
8-faces	{3^{7}}
7-faces	{3^{6}}
6-faces	{3^{5}}
5-faces	{3^{4}}
4-faces	{3^{3}}
Cells	{3^{2}}
Faces	{3}
Vertex figure	5_{21}
Symmetry group	${\bar{T}}_9$, [3^{6,2,1}]

The 6_{21} honeycomb is constructed from alternating 9-simplex and 9-orthoplex facets within the symmetry of the E_{10} Coxeter group.

This honeycomb is highly regular in the sense that its symmetry group (the affine E_{9} Weyl group) acts transitively on the k-faces for k ≤ 7. All of the k-faces for k ≤ 8 are simplices.

This honeycomb is last in the series of k_{21} polytopes, enumerated by Thorold Gosset in 1900, listing polytopes and honeycombs constructed entirely of regular facets, although his list ended with the 8-dimensional the Euclidean honeycomb, 5_{21}.

=== Construction ===
It is created by a Wythoff construction upon a set of 10 hyperplane mirrors in 9-dimensional hyperbolic space.

The facet information can be extracted from its Coxeter-Dynkin diagram.

Removing the node on the end of the 2-length branch leaves the 9-orthoplex, 6_{11}.

Removing the node on the end of the 1-length branch leaves the 9-simplex.

The vertex figure is determined by removing the ringed node and ringing the neighboring node. This makes the 5_{21} honeycomb.

The edge figure is determined from the vertex figure by removing the ringed node and ringing the neighboring node. This makes the 4_{21} polytope.

The face figure is determined from the edge figure by removing the ringed node and ringing the neighboring node. This makes the 3_{21} polytope.

The cell figure is determined from the face figure by removing the ringed node and ringing the neighboring node. This makes the 2_{21} polytope.

=== Related polytopes and honeycombs ===
The 6_{21} is last in a dimensional series of semiregular polytopes and honeycombs, identified in 1900 by Thorold Gosset. Each member of the sequence has the previous member as its vertex figure. All facets of these polytopes are regular polytopes, namely simplexes and orthoplexes.

k_{21} figures in n dimensions
Space	Finite						Euclidean	Hyperbolic
E_{n}	3	4	5	6	7	8	9	10
Coxeter group	E_{3}=A_{2}A_{1}	E_{4}=A_{4}	E_{5}=D_{5}	E_{6}	E_{7}	E_{8}	E_{9} = ${\tilde{E}}_{8}$ = E_{8}^{+}	E_{10} = ${\bar{T}}_8$ = E_{8}^{++}
Coxeter diagram								
Symmetry	[3^{−1,2,1}]	[3^{0,2,1}]	[3^{1,2,1}]	[3^{2,2,1}]	[3^{3,2,1}]	[3^{4,2,1}]	[3^{5,2,1}]	[3^{6,2,1}]
Order	12	120	1,920	51,840	2,903,040	696,729,600	∞	
Graph							-	-
Name	−1_{21}	0_{21}	1_{21}	2_{21}	3_{21}	4_{21}	5_{21}	6_{21}

== 2_{61} honeycomb ==
2_{61} honeycomb
Family	2_{k1} polytope
Schläfli symbol	{3,3,3^{6,1}}
Coxeter symbol	2_{61}
Coxeter-Dynkin diagram	
9-face types	2_{51}, {3^{8}}
8-face types	2_{41}, {3^{7}}
7-face types	2_{31}, {3^{6}}
6-face types	2_{21}, {3^{5}}
5-face types	2_{11}, {3^{4}}
4-face type	{3^{3}}
Cells	{3^{2}}
Faces	{3}
Vertex figure	1_{61}
Coxeter group	${\bar{T}}_9$, [3^{6,2,1}]

The 2_{61} honeycomb is composed of 2_{51} 9-honeycomb and 9-simplex facets. It is the final figure in the 2_{k1} family.

=== Construction ===
It is created by a Wythoff construction upon a set of 10 hyperplane mirrors in 9-dimensional hyperbolic space.

The facet information can be extracted from its Coxeter-Dynkin diagram.

Removing the node on the short branch leaves the 9-simplex.

Removing the node on the end of the 6-length branch leaves the 2_{51} honeycomb. This is an infinite facet because E10 is a paracompact hyperbolic group.

The vertex figure is determined by removing the ringed node and ringing the neighboring node. This makes the 9-demicube, 1_{61}.

The edge figure is the vertex figure of the edge figure. This makes the rectified 8-simplex, 0_{51}.

The face figure is determined from the edge figure by removing the ringed node and ringing the neighboring node. This makes the 5-simplex prism.

=== Related polytopes and honeycombs ===
The 2_{61} is last in a dimensional series of uniform polytopes and honeycombs.

2_{k1} figures in n dimensions
Space	Finite						Euclidean	Hyperbolic
n	3	4	5	6	7	8	9	10
Coxeter group	E_{3}=A_{2}A_{1}	E_{4}=A_{4}	E_{5}=D_{5}	E_{6}	E_{7}	E_{8}	E_{9} = ${\tilde{E}}_{8}$ = E_{8}^{+}	E_{10} = ${\bar{T}}_8$ = E_{8}^{++}
Coxeter diagram								
Symmetry	[3^{−1,2,1}]	[3^{0,2,1}]	[[3^{1,2,1}]]	[3^{2,2,1}]	[3^{3,2,1}]	[3^{4,2,1}]	[3^{5,2,1}]	[3^{6,2,1}]
Order	12	120	384	51,840	2,903,040	696,729,600	∞	
Graph							-	-
Name	2_{−1,1}	2_{01}	2_{11}	2_{21}	2_{31}	2_{41}	2_{51}	2_{61}

== 1_{62} honeycomb ==
1_{62} honeycomb
Family	1_{k2} polytope
Schläfli symbol	{3,3^{6,2}}
Coxeter symbol	1_{62}
Coxeter-Dynkin diagram	
9-face types	1_{52}, 1_{61}
8-face types	1_{42}, 1_{51}
7-face types	1_{32}, 1_{41}
6-face types	1_{22}, {3^{1,3,1}}, {3^{5}}
5-face types	1_{21}, {3^{4}}
4-face type	1_{11}, {3^{3}}
Cells	{3^{2}}
Faces	{3}
Vertex figure	t_{2}{3^{8}}
Coxeter group	${\bar{T}}_9$, [3^{6,2,1}]

The 1_{62} honeycomb contains 1_{52} (9-honeycomb) and 1_{61} 9-demicube facets. It is the final figure in the 1_{k2} polytope family.

=== Construction ===
It is created by a Wythoff construction upon a set of 10 hyperplane mirrors in 9-dimensional space.

The facet information can be extracted from its Coxeter-Dynkin diagram.

Removing the node on the end of the 2-length branch leaves the 9-demicube, 1_{61}.

Removing the node on the end of the 6-length branch leaves the 1_{52} honeycomb.

The vertex figure is determined by removing the ringed node and ringing the neighboring node. This makes the birectified 9-simplex, 0_{62}.

=== Related polytopes and honeycombs ===
The 1_{62} is last in a dimensional series of uniform polytopes and honeycombs.

1_{k2} figures in n dimensions
Space	Finite						Euclidean	Hyperbolic
n	3	4	5	6	7	8	9	10
Coxeter group	E_{3}=A_{2}A_{1}	E_{4}=A_{4}	E_{5}=D_{5}	E_{6}	E_{7}	E_{8}	E_{9} = ${\tilde{E}}_{8}$ = E_{8}^{+}	E_{10} = ${\bar{T}}_8$ = E_{8}^{++}
Coxeter diagram								
Symmetry (order)	[3^{−1,2,1}]	[3^{0,2,1}]	[3^{1,2,1}]	[[3^{2,2,1}]]	[3^{3,2,1}]	[3^{4,2,1}]	[3^{5,2,1}]	[3^{6,2,1}]
Order	12	120	1,920	103,680	2,903,040	696,729,600	∞	
Graph							-	-
Name	1_{−1,2}	1_{02}	1_{12}	1_{22}	1_{32}	1_{42}	1_{52}	1_{62}

== Notes ==
Fundamental convex regular and uniform polytopes in dimensions 2–10
Family	A_{n}	B_{n}	I_{2}(p) / D_{n}	E_{6} / E_{7} / E_{8} / F_{4} / G_{2}	H_{n}
Regular polygon	Triangle	Square	p-gon	Hexagon	Pentagon
Uniform polyhedron	Tetrahedron	Octahedron • Cube	Demicube		Dodecahedron • Icosahedron
Uniform polychoron	Pentachoron	16-cell • Tesseract	Demitesseract	24-cell	120-cell • 600-cell
Uniform 5-polytope	5-simplex	5-orthoplex • 5-cube	5-demicube		
Uniform 6-polytope	6-simplex	6-orthoplex • 6-cube	6-demicube	1_{22} • 2_{21}	
Uniform 7-polytope	7-simplex	7-orthoplex • 7-cube	7-demicube	1_{32} • 2_{31} • 3_{21}	
Uniform 8-polytope	8-simplex	8-orthoplex • 8-cube	8-demicube	1_{42} • 2_{41} • 4_{21}	
Uniform 9-polytope	9-simplex	9-orthoplex • 9-cube	9-demicube		
Uniform 10-polytope	10-simplex	10-orthoplex • 10-cube	10-demicube		
Uniform n-polytope	n-simplex	n-orthoplex • n-cube	n-demicube	1_{k2} • 2_{k1} • k_{21}	n-pentagonal polytope
Topics: Polytope families • Regular polytope • List of regular polytopes and compounds • Polytope operations
