= E6 polytope =

Orthographic projections in the E_{6} Coxeter plane
2_{21}	1_{22}

In 6-dimensional geometry, there are 39 uniform polytopes with E_{6} symmetry. The two simplest forms are the 2_{21} and 1_{22} polytopes, composed of 27 and 72 vertices respectively.

They can be visualized as symmetric orthographic projections in Coxeter planes of the E_{6} Coxeter group, and other subgroups.

== Graphs ==
Symmetric orthographic projections of these 39 polytopes can be made in the E_{6}, D_{5}, D_{4}, D_{2}, A_{5}, A_{4}, A_{3} Coxeter planes. A_{k} has k+1 symmetry, D_{k} has 2(k-1) symmetry, and E_{6} has 12 symmetry.

Six symmetry planes graphs are shown for 9 of the 39 polytopes in the E_{6} symmetry. The vertices and edges drawn with vertices colored by the number of overlapping vertices in each projective position in progressive order: red, orange, yellow, green, cyan, blue, purple, magenta, red-violet.

#	Coxeter plane graphs						Coxeter diagram Names (acronym)
#	Aut(E_{6}) [18/2]	E_{6} [12]	D_{5} [8]	D_{4} / A_{2} [6]	A_{5} [6]	D_{3} / A_{3} [4]	Coxeter diagram Names (acronym)
1							2_{21} Icosihepta-heptacontadipeton (jak)
2							Rectified 2_{21} Rectified icosihepta-heptacontadipeton (rojak)
3							Trirectified 2_{21} Trirectified icosihepta-heptacontadipeton (harjak)
4							Truncated 2_{21} Truncated icosihepta-heptacontadipeton (tojak)
5							Cantellated 2_{21} Cantellated icosihepta-heptacontadipeton

#	Coxeter plane graphs							Coxeter diagram Names (acronym)
#	Aut(E_{6}) [18]	E_{6} [12]	D_{5} [8]	D_{4} / A_{2} [6]	A_{5} [6]	D_{6} / A_{4} [10]	D_{3} / A_{3} [4]	Coxeter diagram Names (acronym)
6								1_{22} Pentacontatetrapeton (mo)
7								Rectified 1_{22} / Birectified 2_{21} Rectified pentacontatetrapeton (ram)
8								Birectified 1_{22} Birectified pentacontatetrapeton (barm)
9								Truncated 1_{22} Truncated pentacontatetrapeton (tim)

== Notes ==
Fundamental convex regular and uniform polytopes in dimensions 2–10
Family	A_{n}	B_{n}	I_{2}(p) / D_{n}	E_{6} / E_{7} / E_{8} / F_{4} / G_{2}	H_{n}
Regular polygon	Triangle	Square	p-gon	Hexagon	Pentagon
Uniform polyhedron	Tetrahedron	Octahedron • Cube	Demicube		Dodecahedron • Icosahedron
Uniform polychoron	Pentachoron	16-cell • Tesseract	Demitesseract	24-cell	120-cell • 600-cell
Uniform 5-polytope	5-simplex	5-orthoplex • 5-cube	5-demicube		
Uniform 6-polytope	6-simplex	6-orthoplex • 6-cube	6-demicube	1_{22} • 2_{21}	
Uniform 7-polytope	7-simplex	7-orthoplex • 7-cube	7-demicube	1_{32} • 2_{31} • 3_{21}	
Uniform 8-polytope	8-simplex	8-orthoplex • 8-cube	8-demicube	1_{42} • 2_{41} • 4_{21}	
Uniform 9-polytope	9-simplex	9-orthoplex • 9-cube	9-demicube		
Uniform 10-polytope	10-simplex	10-orthoplex • 10-cube	10-demicube		
Uniform n-polytope	n-simplex	n-orthoplex • n-cube	n-demicube	1_{k2} • 2_{k1} • k_{21}	n-pentagonal polytope
Topics: Polytope families • Regular polytope • List of regular polytopes and compounds • Polytope operations
