= 2 41 polytope =

Uniform polytope in 8 dimensional geometry

| 4_{21} | 1_{42} | 2_{41} |
| Rectified 4_{21} | Rectified 1_{42} | Rectified 2_{41} |
| Birectified 4_{21} | Trirectified 4_{21} | |
Orthogonal projections in E_{6} Coxeter plane

In 8-dimensional geometry, the 2_{41} is a uniform 8-polytope, constructed within the symmetry of the E_{8} group.

Its Coxeter symbol is 2_{41}, describing its bifurcating Coxeter-Dynkin diagram, with a single ring on the end of the 2-node sequences.

The rectified 2_{41} is constructed by points at the mid-edges of the 2_{41}. The birectified 2_{41} is constructed by points at the triangle face centers of the 2_{41}, and is the same as the rectified 1_{42}.

These polytopes are part of a family of 255 (2^{8} − 1) convex uniform polytopes in 8-dimensions, made of uniform polytope facets, defined by all permutations of rings in this Coxeter-Dynkin diagram:.

== 2_{41} polytope ==
2_{41} polytope
| Type | Uniform 8-polytope |
| Family | 2_{k1} polytope |
| Schläfli symbol | {3,3,3^{4,1}} |
| Coxeter symbol | 2_{41} |
| Coxeter diagram | |
| 7-faces | 17520: 240 2_{31} 17280 {3^{6}} |
| 6-faces | 144960: 6720 2_{21} 138240 {3^{5}} |
| 5-faces | 544320: 60480 2_{11} 483840 {3^{4}} |
| 4-faces | 1209600: 241920 2_{01} 967680 {3^{3}} |
| Cells | 1209600 {3^{2}} |
| Faces | 483840 {3} |
| Edges | 69120 |
| Vertices | 2160 |
| Vertex figure | 1_{41} |
| Petrie polygon | 30-gon |
| Coxeter group | E_{8}, [3^{4,2,1}] |
| Properties | convex |

The 2_{41} is composed of 17,520 facets (240 2_{31} polytopes and 17,280 7-simplices), 144,960 6-faces (6,720 2_{21} polytopes and 138,240 6-simplices), 544,320 5-faces (60,480 2_{11} and 483,840 5-simplices), 1,209,600 4-faces (4-simplices), 1,209,600 cells (tetrahedra), 483,840 faces (triangles), 69,120 edges, and 2160 vertices. Its vertex figure is a 7-demicube.

This polytope is a facet in the uniform tessellation, 2_{51} with Coxeter-Dynkin diagram:

=== Alternate names ===
- E. L. Elte named it V_{2160} (for its 2160 vertices) in his 1912 listing of semiregular polytopes.
- It is named 2_{41} by Coxeter for its bifurcating Coxeter-Dynkin diagram, with a single ring on the end of the 2-node sequence.
- Diacositetraconta-myriaheptachiliadiacosioctaconta-zetton for 240-17280 facetted polyzetton; Acronym: bay (Jonathan Bowers)

=== Coordinates ===
The 2160 vertices can be defined as follows:

16 permutations of (±4,0,0,0,0,0,0,0) of (8-orthoplex)
1120 permutations of (±2,±2,±2,±2,0,0,0,0) of (trirectified 8-orthoplex)
1024 permutations of (±3,±1,±1,±1,±1,±1,±1,±1) with an odd number of minus-signs

=== Construction ===
It is created by a Wythoff construction upon a set of 8 hyperplane mirrors in 8-dimensional space.

The facet information can be extracted from its Coxeter-Dynkin diagram:.

Removing the node on the short branch leaves the 7-simplex:. There are 17280 of these facets

Removing the node on the end of the 4-length branch leaves the 2_{31},. There are 240 of these facets. They are centered at the positions of the 240 vertices in the 4_{21} polytope.

The vertex figure is determined by removing the ringed node and ringing the neighboring node. This makes the 7-demicube, 1_{41},.

Seen in a configuration matrix, the element counts can be derived by mirror removal and ratios of Coxeter group orders.

| | Configuration matrix | | | | | | | | | | | | | | | | |
| E_{8} | | k-face | f_{k} | f_{0} | f_{1} | f_{2} | f_{3} | f_{4} | | f_{5} | | f_{6} | | f_{7} | | k-figure | Notes |
|---|---|---|---|---|---|---|---|---|---|---|---|---|---|---|---|---|---|
| D_{7} | | ( ) | f_{0} | 2160 | 64 | 672 | 2240 | 560 | 2240 | 280 | 1344 | 84 | 448 | 14 | 64 | h{4,3,3,3,3,3} | E_{8}/D_{7} = 192·10!/64/7! = 2160 |
| A_{6}A_{1} | | { } | f_{1} | 2 | 69120 | 21 | 105 | 35 | 140 | 35 | 105 | 21 | 42 | 7 | 7 | r{3,3,3,3,3} | E_{8}/A_{6}A_{1} = 192·10!/7!/2 = 69120 |
| A_{4}A_{2}A_{1} | | {3} | f_{2} | 3 | 3 | 483840 | 10 | 5 | 20 | 10 | 20 | 10 | 10 | 5 | 2 | {}x{3,3,3} | E_{8}/A_{4}A_{2}A_{1} = 192·10!/5!/3!/2 = 483840 |
| A_{3}A_{3} | | {3,3} | f_{3} | 4 | 6 | 4 | 1209600 | 1 | 4 | 4 | 6 | 6 | 4 | 4 | 1 | {3,3}V( ) | E_{8}/A_{3}A_{3} = 192·10!/4!/4! = 1209600 |
| A_{4}A_{3} | | {3,3,3} | f_{4} | 5 | 10 | 10 | 5 | 241920 | * | 4 | 0 | 6 | 0 | 4 | 0 | {3,3} | E_{8}/A_{4}A_{3} = 192·10!/5!/4! = 241920 |
| A_{4}A_{2} | | {3,3,3} | f_{4} | 5 | 10 | 10 | 5 | * | 967680 | 1 | 3 | 3 | 3 | 3 | 1 | {3}V( ) | E_{8}/A_{4}A_{2} = 192·10!/5!/3! = 967680 |
| D_{5}A_{2} | | {3,3,3^{1,1}} | f_{5} | 10 | 40 | 80 | 80 | 16 | 16 | 60480 | * | 3 | 0 | 3 | 0 | {3} | E_{8}/D_{5}A_{2} = 192·10!/16/5!/2 = 40480 |
| A_{5}A_{1} | | {3,3,3,3} | f_{5} | 6 | 15 | 20 | 15 | 0 | 6 | * | 483840 | 1 | 2 | 2 | 1 | { }V( ) | E_{8}/A_{5}A_{1} = 192·10!/6!/2 = 483840 |
| E_{6}A_{1} | | {3,3,3^{2,1}} | f_{6} | 27 | 216 | 720 | 1080 | 216 | 432 | 27 | 72 | 6720 | * | 2 | 0 | { } | E_{8}/E_{6}A_{1} = 192·10!/72/6! = 6720 |
| A_{6} | | {3,3,3,3,3} | f_{6} | 7 | 21 | 35 | 35 | 0 | 21 | 0 | 7 | * | 138240 | 1 | 1 | { } | E_{8}/A_{6} = 192·10!/7! = 138240 |
| E_{7} | | {3,3,3^{3,1}} | f_{7} | 126 | 2016 | 10080 | 20160 | 4032 | 12096 | 756 | 4032 | 56 | 576 | 240 | * | ( ) | E_{8}/E_{7} = 192·10!/72!/8! = 240 |
| A_{7} | | {3,3,3,3,3,3} | f_{7} | 8 | 28 | 56 | 70 | 0 | 56 | 0 | 28 | 0 | 8 | * | 17280 | ( ) | E_{8}/A_{7} = 192·10!/8! = 17280 |

=== Visualizations ===
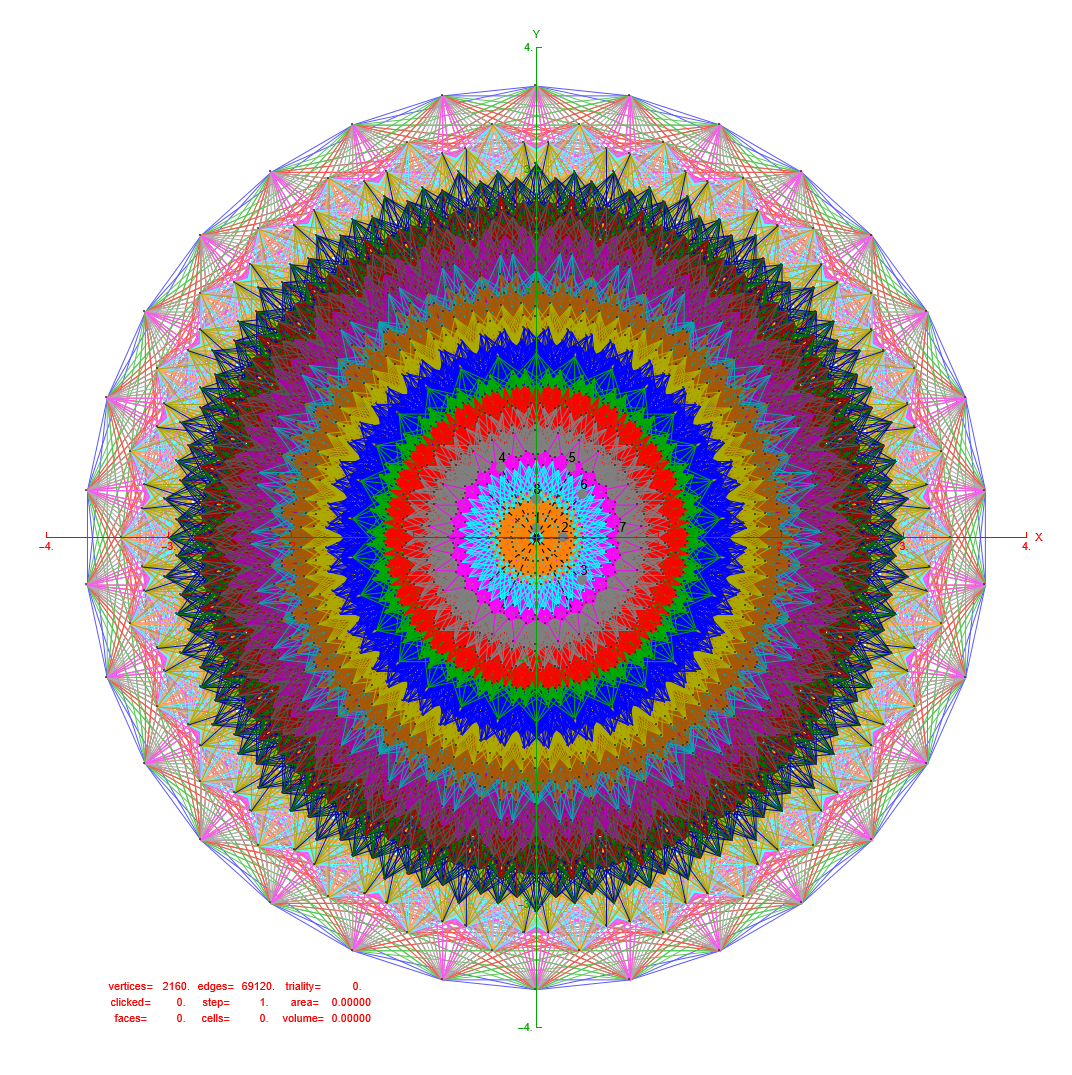
The projection of 2_{41} to the E_{8} Coxeter plane (also known as the Petrie projection) with polytope radius $2\sqrt{2}$ and 69120 edges of length $2\sqrt{2}$

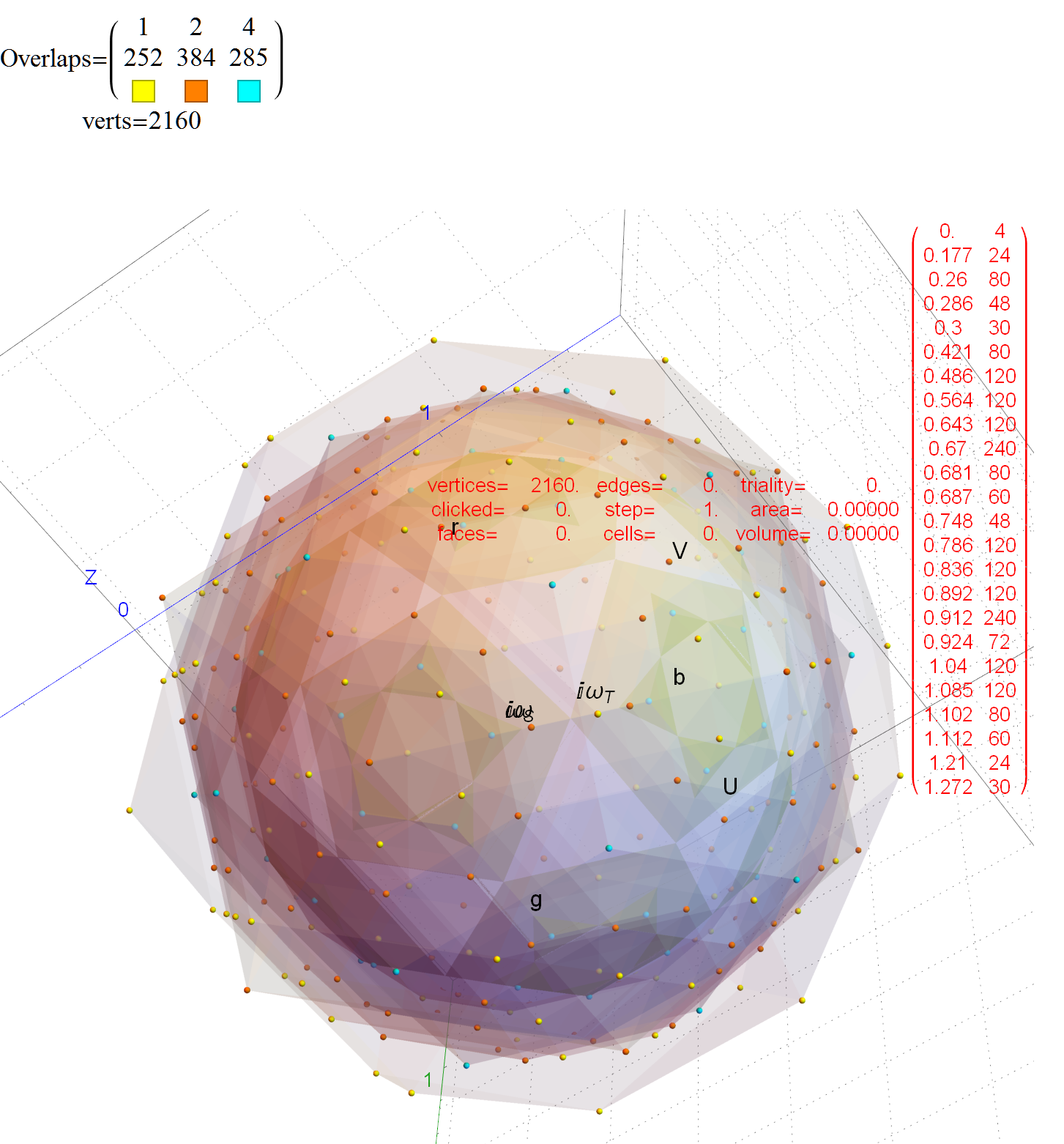
Shown in 3D projection using the basis vectors [u,v,w] giving H3 symmetry: u = (1, φ, 0, −1, φ, 0, 0, 0); v = (φ, 0, 1, φ, 0, −1, 0, 0); w = (0, 1, φ, 0, −1, φ, 0, 0); The 2160 projected 2_{41} polytope vertices are sorted and tallied by their 3D norm generating the increasingly transparent hulls for each set of tallied norms. The overlapping vertices are color coded by overlap count. Also shown is a list of each hull group, the normed distance from the origin, and the number of vertices in the group.

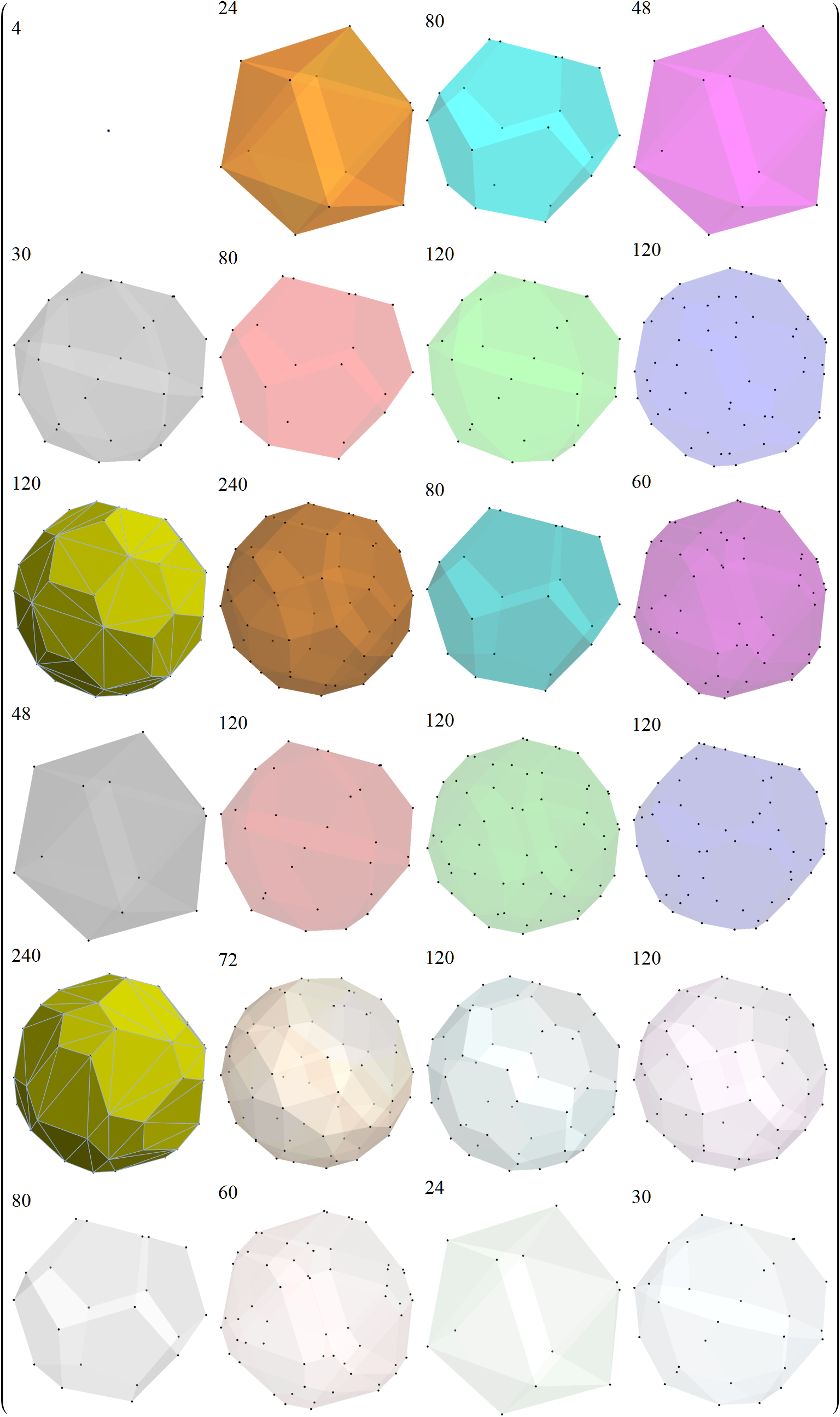
The 2160 projected 2_{41} polytope projected to 3D (as above) with each normed hull group listed individually with vertex counts. The last two outer hulls are a combination of two overlapped icosahedrons (24) and an icosidodecahedron (30).

| E8 [30] | [20] | [24] |
|---|---|---|
| (1) | | |
| E7 [18] | E6 [12] | [6] |
| | (1,8,24,32) | |

Petrie polygon projections are 12, 18, or 30-sided based on the E6, E7, and E8 symmetries (respectively). The 2160 vertices are all displayed, but lower symmetry forms have projected positions overlapping, shown as different colored vertices. For comparison, a B6 coxeter group is also shown.

| D3 / B2 / A3 [4] | D4 / B3 / A2 [6] | D5 / B4 [8] |
| D6 / B5 / A4 [10] | D7 / B6 [12] | D8 / B7 / A6 [14] |
|---|---|---|
| | (1,3,9,12,18,21,36) | |
| B8 [16/2] | A5 [6] | A7 [8] |

=== Related polytopes and honeycombs ===
2_{k1} figures in n dimensions
| Space | Finite | | | | | | Euclidean | Hyperbolic |
| n | 3 | 4 | 5 | 6 | 7 | 8 | 9 | 10 |
|---|---|---|---|---|---|---|---|---|
| Coxeter group | E_{3}=A_{2}A_{1} | E_{4}=A_{4} | E_{5}=D_{5} | E_{6} | E_{7} | E_{8} | E_{9} = ${\tilde{E}}_{8}$ = E_{8}^{+} | E_{10} = ${\bar{T}}_8$ = E_{8}^{++} |
| Coxeter diagram | | | | | | | | |
| Symmetry | [3^{−1,2,1}] | [3^{0,2,1}] | [[3^{1,2,1}]] | [3^{2,2,1}] | [3^{3,2,1}] | [3^{4,2,1}] | [3^{5,2,1}] | [3^{6,2,1}] |
| Order | 12 | 120 | 384 | 51,840 | 2,903,040 | 696,729,600 | ∞ | |
| Graph | | | | | | | - | - |
| Name | 2_{−1,1} | 2_{01} | 2_{11} | 2_{21} | 2_{31} | 2_{41} | 2_{51} | 2_{61} |

== Rectified 2_{41} polytope ==
Rectified 2_{41} polytope
| Type | Uniform 8-polytope |
| Schläfli symbol | t_{1}{3,3,3^{4,1}} |
| Coxeter symbol | t_{1}(2_{41}) |
| Coxeter diagram | |
| 7-faces | 19680 total: 240 t_{1}(2_{21}); 17280 t_{1}{3^{6}} 2160 1_{41} |
| 6-faces | 313440 |
| 5-faces | 1693440 |
| 4-faces | 4717440 |
| Cells | 7257600 |
| Faces | 5322240 |
| Edges | 19680 |
| Vertices | 69120 |
| Vertex figure | rectified 6-simplex prism |
| Petrie polygon | 30-gon |
| Coxeter group | E_{8}, [3^{4,2,1}] |
| Properties | convex |

The rectified 2_{41} is a rectification of the 2_{41} polytope, with vertices positioned at the mid-edges of the 2_{41}.

=== Alternate names ===
- Rectified diacositetraconta-myriaheptachiliadiacosioctaconta-zetton for rectified 240-17280 facetted polyzetton; Acronym: robay (Jonathan Bowers)

=== Construction ===
It is created by a Wythoff construction upon a set of 8 hyperplane mirrors in 8-dimensional space, defined by root vectors of the E_{8} Coxeter group.

The facet information can be extracted from its Coxeter-Dynkin diagram:.

Removing the node on the short branch leaves the rectified 7-simplex:.

Removing the node on the end of the 4-length branch leaves the rectified 2_{31},.

Removing the node on the end of the 2-length branch leaves the 7-demicube, 1_{41}.

The vertex figure is determined by removing the ringed node and ringing the neighboring node. This makes the rectified 6-simplex prism,.

=== Visualizations ===
Petrie polygon projections are 12, 18, or 30-sided based on the E6, E7, and E8 symmetries (respectively). The 2160 vertices are all displayed, but lower symmetry forms have projected positions overlapping, shown as different colored vertices. For comparison, a B6 coxeter group is also shown.

| E8 [30] | [20] | [24] |
|---|---|---|
| (1) | | |
| E7 [18] | E6 [12] | [6] |

| D3 / B2 / A3 [4] | D4 / B3 / A2 [6] | D5 / B4 [8] |
| D6 / B5 / A4 [10] | D7 / B6 [12] | D8 / B7 / A6 [14] |
| B8 [16/2] | A5 [6] | A7 [8] |

== See also ==
- List of E8 polytopes

== Notes ==
Fundamental convex regular and uniform polytopes in dimensions 2–10
| Family | A_{n} | B_{n} | I_{2}(p) / D_{n} | E_{6} / E_{7} / E_{8} / F_{4} / G_{2} | H_{n} |
| Regular polygon | Triangle | Square | p-gon | Hexagon | Pentagon |
| Uniform polyhedron | Tetrahedron | Octahedron • Cube | Demicube | | Dodecahedron • Icosahedron |
| Uniform polychoron | Pentachoron | 16-cell • Tesseract | Demitesseract | 24-cell | 120-cell • 600-cell |
| Uniform 5-polytope | 5-simplex | 5-orthoplex • 5-cube | 5-demicube | | |
| Uniform 6-polytope | 6-simplex | 6-orthoplex • 6-cube | 6-demicube | 1_{22} • 2_{21} | |
| Uniform 7-polytope | 7-simplex | 7-orthoplex • 7-cube | 7-demicube | 1_{32} • 2_{31} • 3_{21} | |
| Uniform 8-polytope | 8-simplex | 8-orthoplex • 8-cube | 8-demicube | 1_{42} • 2_{41} • 4_{21} | |
| Uniform 9-polytope | 9-simplex | 9-orthoplex • 9-cube | 9-demicube | | |
| Uniform 10-polytope | 10-simplex | 10-orthoplex • 10-cube | 10-demicube | | |
| Uniform n-polytope | n-simplex | n-orthoplex • n-cube | n-demicube | 1_{k2} • 2_{k1} • k_{21} | n-pentagonal polytope |
Topics: Polytope families • Regular polytope • List of regular polytopes and compounds • Polytope operations
