= 2 21 polytope =

Uniform 6-polytope

2_{21}	Rectified 2_{21}	Truncated 2_{21}
(1_{22})	Birectified 2_{21} (Rectified 1_{22})	
Orthogonal projections in E_{6} Coxeter plane

In 6-dimensional geometry, the 2_{21} polytope is a uniform 6-polytope, constructed within the symmetry of the E_{6} group. It was discovered by Thorold Gosset, published in his 1900 paper. He called it a 6-ic semi-regular figure. It is also called the Schläfli polytope.

Its Coxeter symbol is 2_{21}, describing its bifurcating Coxeter-Dynkin diagram, with a single ring on the end of one of the 2-node sequences. He also studied its connection with the 27 lines on the cubic surface, which are naturally in correspondence with the vertices of 2_{21}.

The rectified 2_{21} is constructed by points at the mid-edges of the 2_{21}. The birectified 2_{21} is constructed by points at the triangle face centers of the 2_{21}, and is the same as the rectified 1_{22}.

These polytopes are a part of family of 39 convex uniform polytopes in 6-dimensions, made of uniform 5-polytope facets and vertex figures, defined by all permutations of rings in this Coxeter-Dynkin diagram:.

== 2_{21} polytope ==
2_{21} polytope
Type	Uniform 6-polytope
Family	k_{21} polytope
Schläfli symbol	{3,3,3^{2,1}}
Coxeter symbol	2_{21}
Coxeter-Dynkin diagram	or
5-faces	99 total: 27 2_{11} 72 {3^{4}}
4-faces	648: 432 {3^{3}} 216 {3^{3}}
Cells	1080 {3,3}
Faces	720 {3}
Edges	216
Vertices	27
Vertex figure	1_{21} (5-demicube)
Petrie polygon	Dodecagon
Coxeter group	E_{6}, [3^{2,2,1}], order 51840
Properties	convex

The 2_{21} has 27 vertices, and 99 facets: 27 5-orthoplexes and 72 5-simplices. Its vertex figure is a 5-demicube.

For visualization this 6-dimensional polytope is often displayed in a special skewed orthographic projection direction that fits its 27 vertices within a 12-gonal regular polygon (called a Petrie polygon). Its 216 edges are drawn between 2 rings of 12 vertices, and 3 vertices projected into the center. Higher elements (faces, cells, etc.) can also be extracted and drawn on this projection.

The Schläfli graph is the 1-skeleton of this polytope.

=== Alternate names ===
- E. L. Elte named it V_{27} (for its 27 vertices) in his 1912 listing of semiregular polytopes.
- Icosihepta-heptacontadi-peton - 27-72 facetted polypeton (Acronym: jak) (Jonathan Bowers)

=== Coordinates ===
The 27 vertices can be expressed in 8-space as an edge-figure of the 4_{21} polytope:

(−2, 0, 0, 0,−2, 0, 0, 0),
( 0,−2, 0, 0,−2, 0, 0, 0),
( 0, 0,−2, 0,−2, 0, 0, 0),
( 0, 0, 0,−2,−2, 0, 0, 0),
( 0, 0, 0, 0,−2, 0, 0,−2),
( 0, 0, 0, 0, 0,−2,−2, 0)

( 2, 0, 0, 0,−2, 0, 0, 0),
( 0, 2, 0, 0,−2, 0, 0, 0),
( 0, 0, 2, 0,−2, 0, 0, 0),
( 0, 0, 0, 2,−2, 0, 0, 0),
( 0, 0, 0, 0,−2, 0, 0, 2)

(−1,−1,−1,−1,−1,−1,−1,−1),
(−1,−1,−1, 1,−1,−1,−1, 1),
(−1,−1, 1,−1,−1,−1,−1, 1),
(−1,−1, 1, 1,−1,−1,−1,−1),
(−1, 1,−1,−1,−1,−1,−1, 1),
(−1, 1,−1, 1,−1,−1,−1,−1),
(−1, 1, 1,−1,−1,−1,−1,−1),
( 1,−1,−1,−1,−1,−1,−1, 1),
( 1,−1, 1,−1,−1,−1,−1,−1),
( 1,−1,−1, 1,−1,−1,−1,−1),
( 1, 1,−1,−1,−1,−1,−1,−1),
(−1, 1, 1, 1,−1,−1,−1, 1),
( 1,−1, 1, 1,−1,−1,−1, 1),
( 1, 1,−1, 1,−1,−1,−1, 1),
( 1, 1, 1,−1,−1,−1,−1, 1),
( 1, 1, 1, 1,−1,−1,−1,−1)

=== Construction ===
Its construction is based on the E_{6} group. The facet information can be extracted from its Coxeter-Dynkin diagram,. Removing the node on the short branch leaves the 5-simplex,. Removing the node on the end of the 2-length branch leaves the 5-orthoplex in its alternated form: (2_{11}),. Every simplex facet touches a 5-orthoplex facet, while alternate facets of the orthoplex touch either a simplex or another orthoplex.

The vertex figure is determined by removing the ringed node and ringing the neighboring node. This makes 5-demicube (1_{21} polytope),. The edge-figure is the vertex figure of the vertex figure, a rectified 5-cell, (0_{21} polytope),.

Seen in a configuration matrix, the element counts can be derived from the Coxeter group orders.

E_{6}	k-face	f_{k}	f_{0}	f_{1}	f_{2}	f_{3}	f_{4}		f_{5}		k-figure	Notes
D_{5}	( )	f_{0}	27	16	80	160	80	40	16	10	h{4,3,3,3}	E_{6}/D_{5} = 51840/1920 = 27
A_{4}A_{1}	{ }	f_{1}	2	216	10	30	20	10	5	5	r{3,3,3}	E_{6}/A_{4}A_{1} = 51840/120/2 = 216
A_{2}A_{2}A_{1}	{3}	f_{2}	3	3	720	6	6	3	2	3	{3}x{ }	E_{6}/A_{2}A_{2}A_{1} = 51840/6/6/2 = 720
A_{3}A_{1}	{3,3}	f_{3}	4	6	4	1080	2	1	1	2	{ }v( )	E_{6}/A_{3}A_{1} = 51840/24/2 = 1080
A_{4}	{3,3,3}	f_{4}	5	10	10	5	432	*	1	1	{ }	E_{6}/A_{4} = 51840/120 = 432
A_{4}A_{1}	{3,3,3}	f_{4}	5	10	10	5	*	216	0	2	{ }	E_{6}/A_{4}A_{1} = 51840/120/2 = 216
A_{5}	{3,3,3,3}	f_{5}	6	15	20	15	6	0	72	*	( )	E_{6}/A_{5} = 51840/720 = 72
D_{5}	{3,3,3,4}	f_{5}	10	40	80	80	16	16	*	27	( )	E_{6}/D_{5} = 51840/1920 = 27

=== Images ===
Vertices are colored by their multiplicity in this projection, in progressive order: red, orange, yellow. The multiplicities of vertices by color are given in parentheses.

Coxeter plane orthographic projections
E6 [12]	D5 [8]	D4 / A2 [6]	B6 [12/2]
(1,3)	(1,3)	(3,9)	(1,3)
A5 [6]	A4 [5]	A3 / D3 [4]	
(1,3)	(1,2)	(1,4,7)	

=== Geometric folding ===
The 2_{21} is related to the 24-cell by a geometric folding of the E6/F4 Coxeter-Dynkin diagrams. This can be seen in the Coxeter plane projections. The 24 vertices of the 24-cell are projected in the same two rings as seen in the 2_{21}.

E_{6}	F_{4}
2_{21}	24-cell

This polytope can tessellate Euclidean 6-space, forming the 2_{22} honeycomb with this Coxeter-Dynkin diagram:.

=== Related complex polyhedra ===
The regular complex polygon _{3}{3}_{3}{3}_{3},, in $\mathbb{C}^2$ has a real representation as the 2_{21} polytope,, in 4-dimensional space. It is called a Hessian polyhedron after Edmund Hess. It has 27 vertices, 72 3-edges, and 27 3{3}3 faces. Its complex reflection group is _{3}[3]_{3}[3]_{3}, order 648.

=== Related polytopes ===
The 2_{21} is fourth in a dimensional series of semiregular polytopes. Each progressive uniform polytope is constructed vertex figure of the previous polytope. Thorold Gosset identified this series in 1900 as containing all regular polytope facets, containing all simplexes and orthoplexes.

k_{21} figures in n dimensions
Space	Finite						Euclidean	Hyperbolic
E_{n}	3	4	5	6	7	8	9	10
Coxeter group	E_{3}=A_{2}A_{1}	E_{4}=A_{4}	E_{5}=D_{5}	E_{6}	E_{7}	E_{8}	E_{9} = ${\tilde{E}}_{8}$ = E_{8}^{+}	E_{10} = ${\bar{T}}_8$ = E_{8}^{++}
Coxeter diagram								
Symmetry	[3^{−1,2,1}]	[3^{0,2,1}]	[3^{1,2,1}]	[3^{2,2,1}]	[3^{3,2,1}]	[3^{4,2,1}]	[3^{5,2,1}]	[3^{6,2,1}]
Order	12	120	1,920	51,840	2,903,040	696,729,600	∞	
Graph							-	-
Name	−1_{21}	0_{21}	1_{21}	2_{21}	3_{21}	4_{21}	5_{21}	6_{21}

The 2_{21} polytope is fourth in dimensional series 2_{k1}.

2_{k1} figures in n dimensions
Space	Finite						Euclidean	Hyperbolic
n	3	4	5	6	7	8	9	10
Coxeter group	E_{3}=A_{2}A_{1}	E_{4}=A_{4}	E_{5}=D_{5}	E_{6}	E_{7}	E_{8}	E_{9} = ${\tilde{E}}_{8}$ = E_{8}^{+}	E_{10} = ${\bar{T}}_8$ = E_{8}^{++}
Coxeter diagram								
Symmetry	[3^{−1,2,1}]	[3^{0,2,1}]	[[3^{1,2,1}]]	[3^{2,2,1}]	[3^{3,2,1}]	[3^{4,2,1}]	[3^{5,2,1}]	[3^{6,2,1}]
Order	12	120	384	51,840	2,903,040	696,729,600	∞	
Graph							-	-
Name	2_{−1,1}	2_{01}	2_{11}	2_{21}	2_{31}	2_{41}	2_{51}	2_{61}

The 2_{21} polytope is second in dimensional series 2_{2k}.

2_{2k} figures of n dimensions
Space	Finite			Euclidean	Hyperbolic
n	4	5	6	7	8
Coxeter group	A_{2}A_{2}	A_{5}	E_{6}	${\tilde{E}}_{6}$=E_{6}^{+}	E_{6}^{++}
Coxeter diagram					
Graph				∞	∞
Name	2_{2,-1}	2_{20}	2_{21}	2_{22}	2_{23}

== Rectified 2_{21} polytope ==
Rectified 2_{21} polytope
Type	Uniform 6-polytope
Schläfli symbol	t_{1}{3,3,3^{2,1}}
Coxeter symbol	t_{1}(2_{21})
Coxeter-Dynkin diagram	or
5-faces	126 total: 72 t_{1}{3^{4}} 27 t_{1}{3^{3},4} 27 t_{1}{3,3^{2,1}}
4-faces	1350
Cells	4320
Faces	5040
Edges	2160
Vertices	216
Vertex figure	rectified 5-cell prism
Coxeter group	E_{6}, [3^{2,2,1}], order 51840
Properties	convex

The rectified 2_{21} has 216 vertices, and 126 facets: 72 rectified 5-simplices, and 27 rectified 5-orthoplexes and 27 5-demicubes . Its vertex figure is a rectified 5-cell prism.

=== Alternate names ===
- Rectified icosihepta-heptacontadi-peton as a rectified 27-72 facetted polypeton (Acronym: rojak) (Jonathan Bowers)

=== Construction ===
Its construction is based on the E_{6} group and information can be extracted from the ringed Coxeter-Dynkin diagram representing this polytope:. Removing the ring on the short branch leaves the rectified 5-simplex,. Removing the ring on the end of the other 2-length branch leaves the rectified 5-orthoplex in its alternated form: t_{1}(2_{11}),. Removing the ring on the end of the same 2-length branch leaves the 5-demicube: (1_{21}),.

The vertex figure is determined by removing the ringed ring and ringing the neighboring ring. This makes rectified 5-cell prism, t_{1}{3,3,3}x{},.

=== Images ===
Vertices are colored by their multiplicity in this projection, in progressive order: red, orange, yellow, green, cyan.

Coxeter plane orthographic projections
E6 [12]	D5 [8]	D4 / A2 [6]	B6 [12/2]
(1,2,3)	(1,2,3)	(r,o,y,g)	(1,2,3)
A5 [6]	A4 [5]	A3 / D3 [4]	
(r,o,y,g,c)	(1,2,3)	(r,o,y,g,c)	

== Truncated 2_{21} polytope ==
Truncated 2_{21} polytope
Type	Uniform 6-polytope
Schläfli symbol	t{3,3,3^{2,1}}
Coxeter symbol	t(2_{21})
Coxeter-Dynkin diagram	or
5-faces	72+27+27
4-faces	432+216+432+270
Cells	1080+2160+1080
Faces	720+4320
Edges	216+2160
Vertices	432
Vertex figure	( ) v r{3,3,3}
Coxeter group	E_{6}, [3^{2,2,1}], order 51840
Properties	convex

The truncated 2_{21} has 432 vertices, 2376 edges, 5040 faces, 4320 cells, 1350 4-faces, and 126 5-faces. Its vertex figure is a rectified 5-cell pyramid.

=== Alternate names ===
- Truncated icosihepta-heptacontadi-peton as a truncated 27-72 facetted polypeton (Acronym: tojak)

=== Images ===
Vertices are colored by their multiplicity in this projection, in progressive order: red, orange, yellow, green, cyan, blue, purple.

Coxeter plane orthographic projections
E6 [12]	D5 [8]	D4 / A2 [6]	B6 [12/2]
(1,2)	(1,2)	(r,o,y,g)	(1,2)
A5 [6]	A4 [5]	A3 / D3 [4]	
(r,o,y,g,c,b,p)	(1,2)	(r,o,y,g,c,b,p)	

== See also ==
- List of E6 polytopes

== Notes ==
Fundamental convex regular and uniform polytopes in dimensions 2–10
Family	A_{n}	B_{n}	I_{2}(p) / D_{n}	E_{6} / E_{7} / E_{8} / F_{4} / G_{2}	H_{n}
Regular polygon	Triangle	Square	p-gon	Hexagon	Pentagon
Uniform polyhedron	Tetrahedron	Octahedron • Cube	Demicube		Dodecahedron • Icosahedron
Uniform polychoron	Pentachoron	16-cell • Tesseract	Demitesseract	24-cell	120-cell • 600-cell
Uniform 5-polytope	5-simplex	5-orthoplex • 5-cube	5-demicube		
Uniform 6-polytope	6-simplex	6-orthoplex • 6-cube	6-demicube	1_{22} • 2_{21}	
Uniform 7-polytope	7-simplex	7-orthoplex • 7-cube	7-demicube	1_{32} • 2_{31} • 3_{21}	
Uniform 8-polytope	8-simplex	8-orthoplex • 8-cube	8-demicube	1_{42} • 2_{41} • 4_{21}	
Uniform 9-polytope	9-simplex	9-orthoplex • 9-cube	9-demicube		
Uniform 10-polytope	10-simplex	10-orthoplex • 10-cube	10-demicube		
Uniform n-polytope	n-simplex	n-orthoplex • n-cube	n-demicube	1_{k2} • 2_{k1} • k_{21}	n-pentagonal polytope
Topics: Polytope families • Regular polytope • List of regular polytopes and compounds • Polytope operations
