= 4 21 polytope =

Polytope in 8-dimensional geometry

4_{21}	1_{42}	2_{41}
Rectified 4_{21}	Rectified 1_{42}	Rectified 2_{41}
Birectified 4_{21}	Trirectified 4_{21}	
Orthogonal projections in E_{6} Coxeter plane

In 8-dimensional geometry, the 4_{21} is a semiregular uniform 8-polytope, constructed within the symmetry of the E_{8} group. It was discovered by Thorold Gosset, published in his 1900 paper. He called it an 8-ic semi-regular figure.

Its Coxeter symbol is 4_{21}, describing its bifurcating Coxeter-Dynkin diagram, with a single ring on the end of the 4-node sequences,.

The rectified 4_{21} is constructed by points at the mid-edges of the 4_{21}. The birectified 4_{21} is constructed by points at the triangle face centers of the 4_{21}. The trirectified 4_{21} is constructed by points at the tetrahedral centers of the 4_{21}.

These polytopes are part of a family of 255 = 2^{8} − 1 convex uniform 8-polytopes, made of uniform 7-polytope facets and vertex figures, defined by all permutations of one or more rings in this Coxeter-Dynkin diagram:.

== 4_{21} polytope ==
4_{21}
Type	Uniform 8-polytope
Family	k_{21} polytope
Schläfli symbol	{3,3,3,3,3^{2,1}}
Coxeter symbol	4_{21}
Coxeter diagrams	=
7-faces	19440 total: 2160 4_{11} 17280 {3^{6}}
6-faces	207360: 138240 {3^{5}} 69120 {3^{5}}
5-faces	483840 {3^{4}}
4-faces	483840 {3^{3}}
Cells	241920 {3,3}
Faces	60480 {3}
Edges	6720
Vertices	240
Vertex figure	3_{21} polytope
Petrie polygon	30-gon
Coxeter group	E_{8}, [3^{4,2,1}], order 696729600
Properties	convex

The 4_{21} polytope has 17,280 7-simplex and 2,160 7-orthoplex facets, and 240 vertices. Its vertex figure is the 3_{21} polytope. As its vertices represent the root vectors of the simple Lie group E_{8}, this polytope is sometimes referred to as the E_{8} root polytope.

The vertices of this polytope can also be obtained by taking the 240 integral octonions of norm 1. Because the octonions are a nonassociative normed division algebra, these 240 points have a multiplication operation making them not into a group but rather a loop, in fact a Moufang loop.

For visualization this 8-dimensional polytope is often displayed in a special skewed orthographic projection direction that fits its 240 vertices within a regular triacontagon (called a Petrie polygon). Its 6720 edges are drawn between the 240 vertices. Specific higher elements (faces, cells, etc.) can also be extracted and drawn on this projection.

=== Alternative names ===
- This polytope was discovered by Thorold Gosset, who described it in his 1900 paper as an 8-ic semi-regular figure. It is the last finite semiregular figure in his enumeration, semiregular to him meaning that it contained only regular facets.
- E. L. Elte named it V_{240} (for its 240 vertices) in his 1912 listing of semiregular polytopes.
- H.S.M. Coxeter called it 4_{21} because its Coxeter-Dynkin diagram has three branches of length 4, 2, and 1, with a single node on the terminal node of the 4 branch.
- Dischiliahectohexaconta-myriaheptachiliadiacosioctaconta-zetton (Acronym: fy) - 2160-17280 facetted polyzetton (Jonathan Bowers)

=== Coordinates ===
It is created by a Wythoff construction upon a set of 8 hyperplane mirrors in 8-dimensional space.

The 240 vertices of the 4_{21} polytope can be constructed in two sets: 112 (2^{2} × ^{8}C_{2}) with coordinates obtained from $(\pm 2,\pm 2,0,0,0,0,0,0)\,$ by taking an arbitrary combination of signs and an arbitrary permutation of coordinates, and 128 roots (2^{7}) with coordinates obtained from $(\pm 1,\pm 1,\pm 1,\pm 1,\pm 1,\pm 1,\pm 1,\pm 1)\,$ by taking an even number of minus signs (or, equivalently, requiring that the sum of all the eight coordinates be a multiple of 4).

Each vertex has 56 nearest neighbors; for example, the nearest neighbors of the vertex $(1,1,1,1,1,1,1,1)$ are those whose coordinates sum to 4, namely the 28 obtained by permuting the coordinates of $(2, 2,0,0,0,0,0,0)\,$ and the 28 obtained by permuting the coordinates of $(1,1,1,1,1,1,-1,-1)$. These 56 points are the vertices of a 3_{21} polytope in 7 dimensions.

Each vertex has 126 second nearest neighbors: for example, the nearest neighbors of the vertex $(1,1,1,1,1,1,1,1)$ are those whose coordinates sum to 0, namely the 56 obtained by permuting the coordinates of $(2, -2,0,0,0,0,0,0)\,$ and the 70 obtained by permuting the coordinates of $(1,1,1,1,-1,-1,-1,-1)$. These 126 points are the vertices of a 2_{31} polytope in 7 dimensions.

Each vertex also has 56 third nearest neighbors, which are the negatives of its nearest neighbors, and one antipodal vertex, for a total of $1 + 56 + 126 + 56 + 1 = 240$ vertices.

Another construction is by taking signed combination of 14 codewords of 8-bit Extended Hamming code(8,4) that give 14 × 2^{4} = 224 vertices and adding trivial signed axis $( \pm 2,0,0,0, 0,0,0,0)$ for last 16 vertices. In this case, vertices are distance of $\sqrt{4}$ from origin rather than $\sqrt{8}$.

 Hamming 8-bit Code
 0  0 0 0 0 0 0 0 0
 1  1 1 1 1 0 0 0 0   ⇒   ± ± ± ± 0 0 0 0
 2  1 1 0 0 1 1 0 0   ⇒   ± ± 0 0 ± ± 0 0
 3  0 0 1 1 1 1 0 0   ⇒   0 0 ± ± ± ± 0 0
 4  1 0 1 0 1 0 1 0   ⇒   ± 0 ± 0 ± 0 ± 0        ±2 0 0 0 0 0 0 0
 5  0 1 0 1 1 0 1 0   ⇒   0 ± 0 ± ± 0 ± 0        0 ±2 0 0 0 0 0 0
 6  0 1 1 0 0 1 1 0   ⇒   0 ± ± 0 0 ± ± 0        0 0 ±2 0 0 0 0 0
 7  1 0 0 1 0 1 1 0   ⇒   ± 0 0 ± 0 ± ± 0        0 0 0 ±2 0 0 0 0
 8  0 1 1 0 1 0 0 1   ⇒   0 ± ± 0 ± 0 0 ±        0 0 0 0 ±2 0 0 0
 9  1 0 0 1 1 0 0 1   ⇒   ± 0 0 ± ± 0 0 ±        0 0 0 0 0 ±2 0 0
 A  1 0 1 0 0 1 0 1   ⇒   ± 0 ± 0 0 ± 0 ±        0 0 0 0 0 0 ±2 0
 B  0 1 0 1 0 1 0 1   ⇒   0 ± 0 ± 0 ± 0 ±        0 0 0 0 0 0 0 ±2
 C  1 1 0 0 0 0 1 1   ⇒   ± ± 0 0 0 0 ± ±
 D  0 0 1 1 0 0 1 1   ⇒   0 0 ± ± 0 0 ± ±
 E  0 0 0 0 1 1 1 1   ⇒   0 0 0 0 ± ± ± ±
 F  1 1 1 1 1 1 1 1
                          ( 224 vertices     +     16 vertices )

Another decomposition gives the 240 points in 9-dimensions as an expanded 8-simplex, and two opposite birectified 8-simplexes, and.

$(3,-3,0,0,0,0,0,0,0)$ : 72 vertices
$(-2,-2,-2,1,1,1,1,1,1)$ : 84 vertices
$(2,2,2,-1,-1,-1,-1,-1,-1)$ : 84 vertices

This arises similarly to the relation of the A8 lattice and E8 lattice, sharing 8 mirrors of A8: .

A7 Coxeter plane projections
Name	4_{21}	expanded 8-simplex	birectified 8-simplex	birectified 8-simplex
Vertices	240	72	84	84
Image				

=== Tessellations ===
This polytope is the vertex figure for a uniform tessellation of 8-dimensional space, represented by symbol 5_{21} and Coxeter-Dynkin diagram:

=== Construction and faces ===
The facet information of this polytope can be extracted from its Coxeter-Dynkin diagram:

Removing the node on the short branch leaves the 7-simplex:

Removing the node on the end of the 2-length branch leaves the 7-orthoplex in its alternated form (4_{11}):

Every 7-simplex facet touches only 7-orthoplex facets, while alternate facets of an orthoplex facet touch either a simplex or another orthoplex. There are 17,280 simplex facets and 2160 orthoplex facets.

Since every 7-simplex has 7 6-simplex facets, each incident to no other 6-simplex, the 4_{21} polytope has 120,960 (7×17,280) 6-simplex faces that are facets of 7-simplexes. Since every 7-orthoplex has 128 (2^{7}) 6-simplex facets, half of which are not incident to 7-simplexes, the 4_{21} polytope has 138,240 (2^{6}×2160) 6-simplex faces that are not facets of 7-simplexes. The 4_{21} polytope thus has two kinds of 6-simplex faces, not interchanged by symmetries of this polytope. The total number of 6-simplex faces is 259200 (120,960+138,240).

The vertex figure of a single-ring polytope is obtained by removing the ringed node and ringing its neighbor(s). This makes the 3_{21} polytope.

Seen in a configuration matrix, the element counts can be derived by mirror removal and ratios of Coxeter group orders.

	Configuration matrix														
E_{8}		k-face	f_{k}	f_{0}	f_{1}	f_{2}	f_{3}	f_{4}	f_{5}	f_{6}		f_{7}		k-figure	Notes
E_{7}		( )	f_{0}	240	56	756	4032	10080	12096	4032	2016	576	126	3_{21} polytope	E_{8}/E_{7} = 192×10!/(72×8!) = 240
A_{1}E_{6}		{ }	f_{1}	2	6720	27	216	720	1080	432	216	72	27	2_{21} polytope	E_{8}/A_{1}E_{6} = 192×10!/(2×72×6!) = 6720
A_{2}D_{5}		{3}	f_{2}	3	3	60480	16	80	160	80	40	16	10	5-demicube	E_{8}/A_{2}D_{5} = 192×10!/(6×2^{4}×5!) = 60480
A_{3}A_{4}		{3,3}	f_{3}	4	6	4	241920	10	30	20	10	5	5	Rectified 5-cell	E_{8}/A_{3}A_{4} = 192×10!/(4!×5!) = 241920
A_{4}A_{2}A_{1}		{3,3,3}	f_{4}	5	10	10	5	483840	6	6	3	2	3	Triangular prism	E_{8}/A_{4}A_{2}A_{1} = 192×10!/(5!×3!×2) = 483840
A_{5}A_{1}		{3,3,3,3}	f_{5}	6	15	20	15	6	483840	2	1	1	2	Isosceles triangle	E_{8}/A_{5}A_{1} = 192×10!/(6!×2) = 483840
A_{6}		{3,3,3,3,3}	f_{6}	7	21	35	35	21	7	138240	*	1	1	{ }	E_{8}/A_{6} = 192×(10!×7!) = 138240
A_{6}A_{1}		{3,3,3,3,3}	f_{6}	7	21	35	35	21	7	*	69120	0	2	{ }	E_{8}/A_{6}A_{1} = 192×10!/(7!×2) = 69120
A_{7}		{3,3,3,3,3,3}	f_{7}	8	28	56	70	56	28	8	0	17280	*	( )	E_{8}/A_{7} = 192×10!/8! = 17280
D_{7}		{3,3,3,3,3,4}	f_{7}	14	84	280	560	672	448	64	64	*	2160	( )	E_{8}/D_{7} = 192×10!/(2^{6}×7!) = 2160

=== Projections ===
The 4_{21} graph created as string art.	E_{8} Coxeter plane projection

==== 3D ====
Mathematical representation of the physical Zome model isomorphic (?) to E8. This is constructed from VisibLie_E8 pictured with all 3360 edges of length √2(√5−1) from two concentric 600-cells (at the golden ratio) with orthogonal projections to perspective 3-space	The actual split real even E8 4_{21} polytope projected into perspective 3-space pictured with all 6720 edges of length √2	E8 rotated to H4+H4φ, projected to 3D, converted to STL, and printed in nylon plastic. Projection basis used: x = {1, φ, 0, −1, φ, 0,0,0} y = {φ, 0, 1, φ, 0, −1,0,0} z = {0, 1, φ, 0, −1, φ,0,0}

==== 2D ====
These graphs represent orthographic projections in the E_{8}, E_{7}, E_{6}, and B_{8}, D_{8}, D_{7}, D_{6}, D_{5}, D_{4}, D_{3}, A_{7}, A_{5} Coxeter planes. The vertex colors are by overlapping multiplicity in the projection: colored by increasing order of multiplicities as red, orange, yellow, green.

Orthogonal projections
E_{8} / H_{4} [30]	[20]	[24]
(Colors: 1)	(Colors: 1)	(Colors: 1)
E_{7} [18]	E_{6} / F_{4} [12]	[6]
(Colors: 1,3,6)	(Colors: 1,8,24)	(Colors: 1,2,3)
D_{3} / B_{2} / A_{3} [4]	D_{4} / B_{3} / A_{2} / G_{2} [6]	D_{5} / B_{4} [8]
(Colors: 1,12,32,60)	(Colors: 1,27,72)	(Colors: 1,8,24)
D_{6} / B_{5} / A_{4} [10]	D_{7} / B_{6} [12]	D_{8} / B_{7} / A_{6} [14]
(Colors: 1,5,10,20)	(Colors: 1,3,9,12)	(Colors: 1,2,3)
B_{8} [16/2]	A_{5} [6]	A_{7} [8]
(Colors: 1)	(Colors: 3,8,24,30)	(Colors: 1,2,4,8)

=== k_{21} family ===
The 4_{21} polytope is last in a family called the k_{21} polytopes. The first polytope in this family is the semiregular triangular prism which is constructed from three squares (2-orthoplexes) and two triangles (2-simplexes).

=== Geometric folding ===
The 4_{21} polytope can be projected into 3-space as a physical vertex-edge model. Pictured here as 2 concentric 600-cells (at the golden ratio) using Zome tools. (Not all of the 3360 edges of length √2(√5-1) are represented.)

The 4_{21} is related to the 600-cell by a geometric folding of the Coxeter-Dynkin diagrams. This can be seen in the E8/H4 Coxeter plane projections. The 240 vertices of the 4_{21} polytope are projected into 4-space as two copies of the 120 vertices of the 600-cell, one copy smaller (scaled by the golden ratio) than the other with the same orientation. Seen as a 2D orthographic projection in the E8/H4 Coxeter plane, the 120 vertices of the 600-cell are projected in the same four rings as seen in the 4_{21}. The other 4 rings of the 4_{21} graph also match a smaller copy of the four rings of the 600-cell.

E8/H4 Coxeter plane foldings
E_{8}	H_{4}
4_{21}	600-cell
[20] symmetry planes
4_{21}	600-cell

=== Related polytopes ===
In 4-dimensional complex geometry, the regular complex polytope _{3}{3}_{3}{3}_{3}{3}_{3}, and Coxeter diagram exists with the same vertex arrangement as the 4_{21} polytope. It is self-dual. Coxeter called it the Witting polytope, after Alexander Witting. Coxeter expresses its Shephard group symmetry by _{3}[3]_{3}[3]_{3}[3]_{3}.

The 4_{21} is sixth in a dimensional series of semiregular polytopes. Each progressive uniform polytope is constructed vertex figure of the previous polytope. Thorold Gosset identified this series in 1900 as containing all regular polytope facets, containing all simplexes and orthoplexes.

k_{21} figures in n dimensions
Space	Finite						Euclidean	Hyperbolic
E_{n}	3	4	5	6	7	8	9	10
Coxeter group	E_{3}=A_{2}A_{1}	E_{4}=A_{4}	E_{5}=D_{5}	E_{6}	E_{7}	E_{8}	E_{9} = ${\tilde{E}}_{8}$ = E_{8}^{+}	E_{10} = ${\bar{T}}_8$ = E_{8}^{++}
Coxeter diagram								
Symmetry	[3^{−1,2,1}]	[3^{0,2,1}]	[3^{1,2,1}]	[3^{2,2,1}]	[3^{3,2,1}]	[3^{4,2,1}]	[3^{5,2,1}]	[3^{6,2,1}]
Order	12	120	1,920	51,840	2,903,040	696,729,600	∞	
Graph							-	-
Name	−1_{21}	0_{21}	1_{21}	2_{21}	3_{21}	4_{21}	5_{21}	6_{21}

== Rectified 4_{21} polytope ==
Rectified 4_{21}
Type	Uniform 8-polytope
Schläfli symbol	t_{1}{3,3,3,3,3^{2,1}}
Coxeter symbol	t_{1}(4_{21})
Coxeter diagram	
7-faces	19680 total: 240 3_{21} 17280 t_{1}{3^{6}} 2160 t_{1}{3^{5},4}
6-faces	375840
5-faces	1935360
4-faces	3386880
Cells	2661120
Faces	1028160
Edges	181440
Vertices	6720
Vertex figure	2_{21} prism
Coxeter group	E_{8}, [3^{4,2,1}]
Properties	convex

The rectified 4_{21} can be seen as a rectification of the 4_{21} polytope, creating new vertices on the center of edges of the 4_{21}.

=== Alternative names ===
- Rectified dischiliahectohexaconta-myriaheptachiliadiacosioctaconta-zetton for rectified 2160-17280 polyzetton (Acronym: riffy) (Jonathan Bowers)

=== Construction ===
It is created by a Wythoff construction upon a set of 8 hyperplane mirrors in 8-dimensional space. It is named for being a rectification of the 4_{21}. Vertices are positioned at the midpoint of all the edges of 4_{21}, and new edges connecting them.

The facet information can be extracted from its Coxeter-Dynkin diagram.

Removing the node on the short branch leaves the rectified 7-simplex:

Removing the node on the end of the 2-length branch leaves the rectified 7-orthoplex in its alternated form:

Removing the node on the end of the 4-length branch leaves the 3_{21}:

The vertex figure is determined by removing the ringed node and adding a ring to the neighboring node. This makes a 2_{21} prism.

=== Coordinates ===
The Cartesian coordinates of the 6720 vertices of the rectified 4_{21} is given by all permutations of coordinates from three other uniform polytope:

- hexic 8-cube - odd negatives: ½(±1,±1,±1,±1,±1,±1,±3,±3) - 3584 vertices
- birectified 8-cube - (0,0,±1,±1,±1,±1,±1,±1) - 1792 vertices
- cantellated 8-orthoplex - (0,0,0,0,0,0,±1,±1,±2) - 1344 vertices

D8 Coxeter plane projections
Name	Rectified 4_{21}	birectified 8-cube =	hexic 8-cube =	cantellated 8-orthoplex =
Vertices	6720	1792	3584	1344
Image				

=== Projections ===
==== 2D ====
These graphs represent orthographic projections in the E_{8}, E_{7}, E_{6}, and B_{8}, D_{8}, D_{7}, D_{6}, D_{5}, D_{4}, D_{3}, A_{7}, A_{5} Coxeter planes. The vertex colors are by overlapping multiplicity in the projection: colored by increasing order of multiplicities as red, orange, yellow, green, cyan, blue, purple, magenta, red-violet.

Orthogonal projections
E_{8} / H_{4} [30]	[20]	[24]
E_{7} [18]	E_{6} / F_{4} [12]	[6]
D_{3} / B_{2} / A_{3} [4]	D_{4} / B_{3} / A_{2} / G_{2} [6]	D_{5} / B_{4} [8]
D_{6} / B_{5} / A_{4} [10]	D_{7} / B_{6} [12]	D_{8} / B_{7} / A_{6} [14]
B_{8} [16/2]	A_{5} [6]	A_{7} [8]

== Birectified 4_{21} polytope ==
Birectified 4_{21} polytope
Type	Uniform 8-polytope
Schläfli symbol	t_{2}{3,3,3,3,3^{2,1}}
Coxeter symbol	t_{2}(4_{21})
Coxeter diagram	
7-faces	19680 total: 17280 t_{2}{3^{6}} 2160 t_{2}{3^{5},4} 240 t_{1}(3_{21})
6-faces	382560
5-faces	2600640
4-faces	7741440
Cells	9918720
Faces	5806080
Edges	1451520
Vertices	60480
Vertex figure	5-demicube-triangular duoprism
Coxeter group	E_{8}, [3^{4,2,1}]
Properties	convex

The birectified 4_{21} can be seen as a second rectification of the uniform 4_{21} polytope. Vertices of this polytope are positioned at the centers of all the 60480 triangular faces of the 4_{21}.

=== Alternative names ===
- Birectified dischiliahectohexaconta-myriaheptachiliadiacosioctaconta-zetton for birectified 2160-17280 polyzetton (Acronym: borfy) (Jonathan Bowers)

=== Construction ===
It is created by a Wythoff construction upon a set of 8 hyperplane mirrors in 8-dimensional space. It is named for being a birectification of the 4_{21}. Vertices are positioned at the center of all the triangle faces of 4_{21}.

The facet information can be extracted from its Coxeter-Dynkin diagram.

Removing the node on the short branch leaves the birectified 7-simplex. There are 17280 of these facets.

Removing the node on the end of the 2-length branch leaves the birectified 7-orthoplex in its alternated form. There are 2160 of these facets.

Removing the node on the end of the 4-length branch leaves the rectified 3_{21}. There are 240 of these facets.

The vertex figure is determined by removing the ringed node and adding rings to the neighboring nodes. This makes a 5-demicube-triangular duoprism.

=== Projections ===
==== 2D ====
These graphs represent orthographic projections in the E_{8}, E_{7}, E_{6}, and B_{8}, D_{8}, D_{7}, D_{6}, D_{5}, D_{4}, D_{3}, A_{7}, A_{5} Coxeter planes. Edges are not drawn. The vertex colors are by overlapping multiplicity in the projection: colored by increasing order of multiplicities as red, orange, yellow, green, cyan, blue, purple, magenta, red-violet.

Orthogonal projections
E_{8} / H_{4} [30]	[20]	[24]
E_{7} [18]	E_{6} / F_{4} [12]	[6]
D_{3} / B_{2} / A_{3} [4]	D_{4} / B_{3} / A_{2} / G_{2} [6]	D_{5} / B_{4} [8]
D_{6} / B_{5} / A_{4} [10]	D_{7} / B_{6} [12]	D_{8} / B_{7} / A_{6} [14]
B_{8} [16/2]	A_{5} [6]	A_{7} [8]

== Trirectified 4_{21} polytope ==
Trirectified 4_{21} polytope
Type	Uniform 8-polytope
Schläfli symbol	t_{3}{3,3,3,3,3^{2,1}}
Coxeter symbol	t_{3}(4_{21})
Coxeter diagram	
7-faces	19680
6-faces	382560
5-faces	2661120
4-faces	9313920
Cells	16934400
Faces	14515200
Edges	4838400
Vertices	241920
Vertex figure	tetrahedron-rectified 5-cell duoprism
Coxeter group	E_{8}, [3^{4,2,1}]
Properties	convex

=== Alternative names ===
- Trirectified dischiliahectohexaconta-myriaheptachiliadiacosioctaconta-zetton for trirectified 2160-17280 polyzetton (Acronym: torfy) (Jonathan Bowers)

=== Construction ===
It is created by a Wythoff construction upon a set of 8 hyperplane mirrors in 8-dimensional space. It is named for being a birectification of the 4_{21}. Vertices are positioned at the center of all the triangle faces of 4_{21}.

The facet information can be extracted from its Coxeter-Dynkin diagram.

Removing the node on the short branch leaves the trirectified 7-simplex:

Removing the node on the end of the 2-length branch leaves the trirectified 7-orthoplex in its alternated form:

Removing the node on the end of the 4-length branch leaves the birectified 3_{21}:

The vertex figure is determined by removing the ringed node and ring the neighbor nodes. This makes a tetrahedron-rectified 5-cell duoprism.

=== Projections ===
==== 2D ====
These graphs represent orthographic projections in the E_{7}, E_{6}, B_{8}, D_{8}, D_{7}, D_{6}, D_{5}, D_{4}, D_{3}, A_{7}, and A_{5} Coxeter planes. The vertex colors are by overlapping multiplicity in the projection: colored by increasing order of multiplicities as red, orange, yellow, green, cyan, blue, purple, magenta, red-violet.

(E_{8} and B_{8} were too large to display)

Orthogonal projections
E_{7} [18]	E_{6} / F_{4} [12]	D_{4} - E_{6} [6]
D_{3} / B_{2} / A_{3} [4]	D_{4} / B_{3} / A_{2} / G_{2} [6]	D_{5} / B_{4} [8]
D_{6} / B_{5} / A_{4} [10]	D_{7} / B_{6} [12]	D_{8} / B_{7} / A_{6} [14]
A_{5} [6]	A_{7} [8]	

== See also ==
- List of E8 polytopes

== Notes ==
Fundamental convex regular and uniform polytopes in dimensions 2–10
Family	A_{n}	B_{n}	I_{2}(p) / D_{n}	E_{6} / E_{7} / E_{8} / F_{4} / G_{2}	H_{n}
Regular polygon	Triangle	Square	p-gon	Hexagon	Pentagon
Uniform polyhedron	Tetrahedron	Octahedron • Cube	Demicube		Dodecahedron • Icosahedron
Uniform polychoron	Pentachoron	16-cell • Tesseract	Demitesseract	24-cell	120-cell • 600-cell
Uniform 5-polytope	5-simplex	5-orthoplex • 5-cube	5-demicube		
Uniform 6-polytope	6-simplex	6-orthoplex • 6-cube	6-demicube	1_{22} • 2_{21}	
Uniform 7-polytope	7-simplex	7-orthoplex • 7-cube	7-demicube	1_{32} • 2_{31} • 3_{21}	
Uniform 8-polytope	8-simplex	8-orthoplex • 8-cube	8-demicube	1_{42} • 2_{41} • 4_{21}	
Uniform 9-polytope	9-simplex	9-orthoplex • 9-cube	9-demicube		
Uniform 10-polytope	10-simplex	10-orthoplex • 10-cube	10-demicube		
Uniform n-polytope	n-simplex	n-orthoplex • n-cube	n-demicube	1_{k2} • 2_{k1} • k_{21}	n-pentagonal polytope
Topics: Polytope families • Regular polytope • List of regular polytopes and compounds • Polytope operations
