= 1 22 polytope =

Uniform 6-polytope

1_{22}	Rectified 1_{22}	Birectified 1_{22}
Trirectified 1_{22}	Truncated 1_{22}	
2_{21}	Rectified 2_{21}	
Orthogonal projections in E_{6} Coxeter plane

In 6-dimensional geometry, the 1_{22} polytope is a uniform polytope, constructed from the E_{6} group. It was first published in E. L. Elte's 1912 listing of semiregular polytopes, named as V_{72} (for its 72 vertices).

Its Coxeter symbol is 1_{22}, describing its bifurcating Coxeter-Dynkin diagram, with a single ring on the end of the 1-node sequence. There are two rectifications of the 1_{22}, constructed by positions points on the elements of 1_{22}. The rectified 1_{22} is constructed by points at the mid-edges of the 1_{22}. The birectified 1_{22} is constructed by points at the triangle face centers of the 1_{22}.

These polytopes are from a family of 39 convex uniform polytopes in 6-dimensions, made of uniform polytope facets and vertex figures, defined by all permutations of rings in this Coxeter-Dynkin diagram:.

== 1_{22} polytope ==
1_{22} polytope
Type	Uniform 6-polytope
Family	1_{k2} polytope
Schläfli symbol	{3,3^{2,2}}
Coxeter symbol	1_{22}
Coxeter-Dynkin diagram	or
5-faces	54: 27 1_{21} 27 1_{21}
4-faces	702: 270 1_{11} 432 1_{20}
Cells	2160: 1080 1_{10} 1080 {3,3}
Faces	2160 {3}
Edges	720
Vertices	72
Vertex figure	Birectified 5-simplex: 0_{22}
Petrie polygon	Dodecagon
Coxeter group	E_{6}, [[3,3^{2,2}]], order 103680
Properties	convex, isotopic

The 1_{22} polytope contains 72 vertices, and 54 5-demicubic facets. It has a birectified 5-simplex vertex figure. Its 72 vertices represent the root vectors of the simple Lie group E_{6}.

=== Alternate names ===
- Pentacontatetrapeton (Acronym: mo) - 54-facetted polypeton (Jonathan Bowers)

=== Images ===
Vertices are colored by their multiplicity in this projection, in progressive order: red, orange, yellow, green. The multiplicities of vertices by color are given in parentheses.

Coxeter plane orthographic projections
E6 [12]	D5 [8]	D4 / A2 [6]	
(1,2)	(1,3)	(1,9,12)	
B6 [12/2]	A5 [6]	A4 [[5]] = [10]	A3 / D3 [4]
(1,2)	(2,3,6)	(1,2)	(1,6,8,12)

=== Construction ===
It is created by a Wythoff construction upon a set of 6 hyperplane mirrors in 6-dimensional space.

The facet information can be extracted from its Coxeter-Dynkin diagram,.

Removing the node on either of 2-length branches leaves the 5-demicube, 1_{21},.

The vertex figure is determined by removing the ringed node and ringing the neighboring node. This makes the birectified 5-simplex, 0_{22},.

Seen in a configuration matrix, the element counts can be derived by mirror removal and ratios of Coxeter group orders.

E_{6}	k-face	f_{k}	f_{0}	f_{1}	f_{2}	f_{3}		f_{4}			f_{5}		k-figure	Notes
A_{5}	( )	f_{0}	72	20	90	60	60	15	15	30	6	6	r{3,3,3}	E_{6}/A_{5} = 72·6!/6! = 72
A_{2}A_{2}A_{1}	{ }	f_{1}	2	720	9	9	9	3	3	9	3	3	{3}×{3}	E_{6}/A_{2}A_{2}A_{1} = 72·6!/3!/3!/2 = 720
A_{2}A_{1}A_{1}	{3}	f_{2}	3	3	2160	2	2	1	1	4	2	2	s{2,4}	E_{6}/A_{2}A_{1}A_{1} = 72·6!/3!/2/2 = 2160
A_{3}A_{1}	{3,3}	f_{3}	4	6	4	1080	*	1	0	2	2	1	{ }∨( )	E_{6}/A_{3}A_{1} = 72·6!/4!/2 = 1080
A_{3}A_{1}	{3,3}	f_{3}	4	6	4	*	1080	0	1	2	1	2	{ }∨( )	E_{6}/A_{3}A_{1} = 72·6!/4!/2 = 1080
A_{4}A_{1}	{3,3,3}	f_{4}	5	10	10	5	0	216	*	*	2	0	{ }	E_{6}/A_{4}A_{1} = 72·6!/5!/2 = 216
A_{4}A_{1}	{3,3,3}	f_{4}	5	10	10	0	5	*	216	*	0	2	{ }	E_{6}/A_{4}A_{1} = 72·6!/5!/2 = 216
D_{4}	h{4,3,3}	f_{4}	8	24	32	8	8	*	*	270	1	1	{ }	E_{6}/D_{4} = 72·6!/8/4! = 270
D_{5}	h{4,3,3,3}	f_{5}	16	80	160	80	40	16	0	10	27	*	( )	E_{6}/D_{5} = 72·6!/16/5! = 27
D_{5}	h{4,3,3,3}	f_{5}	16	80	160	40	80	0	16	10	*	27	( )	E_{6}/D_{5} = 72·6!/16/5! = 27

=== Related complex polyhedron ===
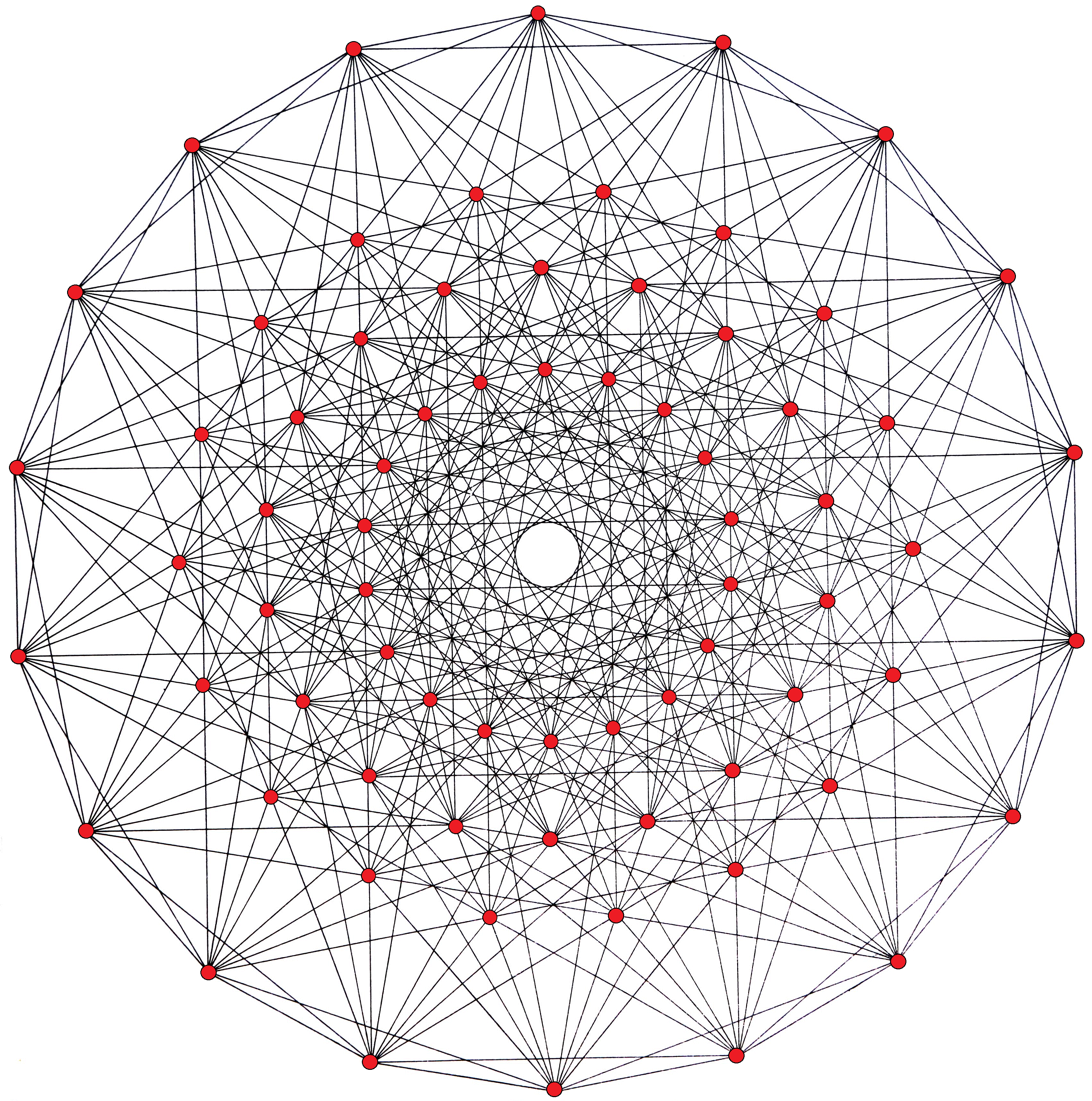
Orthographic projection in Aut(E6) Coxeter plane with 18-gonal symmetry for complex polyhedron, _{3}{3}_{3}{4}_{2}. It has 72 vertices, 216 3-edges, and 54 3{3}3 faces.

The regular complex polyhedron _{3}{3}_{3}{4}_{2},, in $\mathbb{C}^2$ has a real representation as the 1_{22} polytope in 4-dimensional space. It has 72 vertices, 216 3-edges, and 54 3{3}3 faces. Its complex reflection group is _{3}[3]_{3}[4]_{2}, order 1296. It has a half-symmetry quasiregular construction as, as a rectification of the Hessian polyhedron,.

=== Related polytopes and honeycomb ===
Along with the semiregular polytope, 2_{21}, it is also one of a family of 39 convex uniform polytopes in 6-dimensions, made of uniform polytope facets and vertex figures, defined by all permutations of rings in this Coxeter-Dynkin diagram:.

1_{k2} figures in n dimensions
Space	Finite						Euclidean	Hyperbolic
n	3	4	5	6	7	8	9	10
Coxeter group	E_{3}=A_{2}A_{1}	E_{4}=A_{4}	E_{5}=D_{5}	E_{6}	E_{7}	E_{8}	E_{9} = ${\tilde{E}}_{8}$ = E_{8}^{+}	E_{10} = ${\bar{T}}_8$ = E_{8}^{++}
Coxeter diagram								
Symmetry (order)	[3^{−1,2,1}]	[3^{0,2,1}]	[3^{1,2,1}]	[[3^{2,2,1}]]	[3^{3,2,1}]	[3^{4,2,1}]	[3^{5,2,1}]	[3^{6,2,1}]
Order	12	120	1,920	103,680	2,903,040	696,729,600	∞	
Graph							-	-
Name	1_{−1,2}	1_{02}	1_{12}	1_{22}	1_{32}	1_{42}	1_{52}	1_{62}

==== Geometric folding ====
The 1_{22} is related to the 24-cell by a geometric folding E6 → F4 of Coxeter-Dynkin diagrams, E6 corresponding to 1_{22} in 6 dimensions, F4 to the 24-cell in 4 dimensions. This can be seen in the Coxeter plane projections. The 24 vertices of the 24-cell are projected in the same two rings as seen in the 1_{22}.

E6/F4 Coxeter planes
1_{22}	24-cell
D4/B4 Coxeter planes
1_{22}	24-cell

==== Tessellations ====
This polytope is the vertex figure for a uniform tessellation of 6-dimensional space, 2_{22},.

== Rectified 1_{22} polytope ==
Rectified 1_{22}
Type	Uniform 6-polytope
Schläfli symbol	2r{3,3,3^{2,1}} r{3,3^{2,2}}
Coxeter symbol	0_{221}
Coxeter-Dynkin diagram	or
5-faces	126
4-faces	1566
Cells	6480
Faces	6480
Edges	6480
Vertices	720
Vertex figure	3-3 duoprism prism
Petrie polygon	Dodecagon
Coxeter group	E_{6}, [[3,3^{2,2}]], order 103680
Properties	convex

The rectified 1_{22} polytope (also called 0_{221}) can tessellate 6-dimensional space as the Voronoi cell of the E6* honeycomb lattice (dual of E6 lattice).

=== Alternate names ===
- Birectified 2_{21} polytope
- Rectified pentacontatetrapeton (Acronym: ram) - rectified 54-facetted polypeton (Jonathan Bowers)

=== Images ===
Vertices are colored by their multiplicity in this projection, in progressive order: red, orange, yellow, green, cyan, blue, purple.

Coxeter plane orthographic projections
E6 [12]	D5 [8]	D4 / A2 [6]	B6 [12/2]
A5 [6]	A4 [5]	A3 / D3 [4]	

=== Construction ===
Its construction is based on the E_{6} group and information can be extracted from the ringed Coxeter-Dynkin diagram representing this polytope:.

Removing the ring on the short branch leaves the birectified 5-simplex,.

Removing the ring on either of 2-length branches leaves the birectified 5-orthoplex in its alternated form: t_{2}(2_{11}),.

The vertex figure is determined by removing the ringed node and ringing the neighboring ring. This makes 3-3 duoprism prism, {3}×{3}×{},.

Seen in a configuration matrix, the element counts can be derived by mirror removal and ratios of Coxeter group orders.

E_{6}	k-face	f_{k}	f_{0}	f_{1}	f_{2}			f_{3}					f_{4}					f_{5}			k-figure	Notes
A_{2}A_{2}A_{1}	( )	f_{0}	720	18	18	18	9	6	18	9	6	9	6	3	6	9	3	2	3	3	{3}×{3}×{ }	E_{6}/A_{2}A_{2}A_{1} = 72·6!/3!/3!/2 = 720
A_{1}A_{1}A_{1}	{ }	f_{1}	2	6480	2	2	1	1	4	2	1	2	2	1	2	4	1	1	2	2	{ }∨{ }∨( )	E_{6}/A_{1}A_{1}A_{1} = 72·6!/2/2/2 = 6480
A_{2}A_{1}	{3}	f_{2}	3	3	4320	*	*	1	2	1	0	0	2	1	1	2	0	1	2	1	Sphenoid	E_{6}/A_{2}A_{1} = 72·6!/3!/2 = 4320
A_{2}A_{1}	{3}	f_{2}	3	3	*	4320	*	0	2	0	1	1	1	0	2	2	1	1	1	2	Sphenoid	E_{6}/A_{2}A_{1} = 72·6!/3!/2 = 4320
A_{2}A_{1}A_{1}	{3}	f_{2}	3	3	*	*	2160	0	0	2	0	2	0	1	0	4	1	0	2	2	{ }∨{ }	E_{6}/A_{2}A_{1}A_{1} = 72·6!/3!/2/2 = 2160
A_{2}A_{1}	{3,3}	f_{3}	4	6	4	0	0	1080	*	*	*	*	2	1	0	0	0	1	2	0	{ }∨( )	E_{6}/A_{2}A_{1} = 72·6!/3!/2 = 1080
A_{3}	r{3,3}	f_{3}	6	12	4	4	0	*	2160	*	*	*	1	0	1	1	0	1	1	1	{3}	E_{6}/A_{3} = 72·6!/4! = 2160
A_{3}A_{1}	r{3,3}	f_{3}	6	12	4	0	4	*	*	1080	*	*	0	1	0	2	0	0	2	1	{ }∨( )	E_{6}/A_{3}A_{1} = 72·6!/4!/2 = 1080
A_{3}A_{1}	{3,3}	f_{3}	4	6	0	4	0	*	*	*	1080	*	0	0	2	0	1	1	0	2	{ }∨( )	E_{6}/A_{3}A_{1} = 72·6!/4!/2 = 1080
A_{3}A_{1}	r{3,3}	f_{3}	6	12	0	4	4	*	*	*	*	1080	0	0	0	2	1	0	1	2	{ }∨( )	E_{6}/A_{3}A_{1} = 72·6!/4!/2 = 1080
A_{4}	r{3,3,3}	f_{4}	10	30	20	10	0	5	5	0	0	0	432	*	*	*	*	1	1	0	{ }	E_{6}/A_{4} = 72·6!/5! = 432
A_{4}A_{1}	r{3,3,3}	f_{4}	10	30	20	0	10	5	0	5	0	0	*	216	*	*	*	0	2	0	{ }	E_{6}/A_{4}A_{1} = 72·6!/5!/2 = 216
A_{4}	r{3,3,3}	f_{4}	10	30	10	20	0	0	5	0	5	0	*	*	432	*	*	1	0	1	{ }	E_{6}/A_{4} = 72·6!/5! = 432
D_{4}	{3,4,3}	f_{4}	24	96	32	32	32	0	8	8	0	8	*	*	*	270	*	0	1	1	{ }	E_{6}/D_{4} = 72·6!/8/4! = 270
A_{4}A_{1}	r{3,3,3}	f_{4}	10	30	0	20	10	0	0	0	5	5	*	*	*	*	216	0	0	2	{ }	E_{6}/A_{4}A_{1} = 72·6!/5!/2 = 216
A_{5}	2r{3,3,3,3}	f_{5}	20	90	60	60	0	15	30	0	15	0	6	0	6	0	0	72	*	*	( )	E_{6}/A_{5} = 72·6!/6! = 72
D_{5}	2r{4,3,3,3}	f_{5}	80	480	320	160	160	80	80	80	0	40	16	16	0	10	0	*	27	*	( )	E_{6}/D_{5} = 72·6!/16/5! = 27
D_{5}	2r{4,3,3,3}	f_{5}	80	480	160	320	160	0	80	40	80	80	0	0	16	10	16	*	*	27	( )	E_{6}/D_{5} = 72·6!/16/5! = 27

== Truncated 1_{22} polytope ==
Truncated 1_{22}
Type	Uniform 6-polytope
Schläfli symbol	t{3,3^{2,2}}
Coxeter symbol	t(1_{22})
Coxeter-Dynkin diagram	or
5-faces	72+27+27
4-faces	32+216+432+270+216
Cells	1080+2160+1080+1080+1080
Faces	4320+4320+2160
Edges	6480+720
Vertices	1440
Vertex figure	( )v{3}x{3}
Petrie polygon	Dodecagon
Coxeter group	E_{6}, [[3,3^{2,2}]], order 103680
Properties	convex

=== Alternate names ===
- Truncated 1_{22} polytope (Acronym: tim)

=== Construction ===
Its construction is based on the E_{6} group and information can be extracted from the ringed Coxeter-Dynkin diagram representing this polytope:.

=== Images ===
Vertices are colored by their multiplicity in this projection, in progressive order: red, orange, yellow, green, cyan, blue.

Coxeter plane orthographic projections
E6 [12]	D5 [8]	D4 / A2 [6]	B6 [12/2]
A5 [6]	A4 [5]	A3 / D3 [4]	

== Birectified 1_{22} polytope ==
Birectified 1_{22} polytope
Type	Uniform 6-polytope
Schläfli symbol	2r{3,3^{2,2}}
Coxeter symbol	2r(1_{22})
Coxeter-Dynkin diagram	or
5-faces	126
4-faces	2286
Cells	10800
Faces	19440
Edges	12960
Vertices	2160
Vertex figure	
Coxeter group	E_{6}, [[3,3^{2,2}]], order 103680
Properties	convex

=== Alternate names ===
- Bicantellated 2_{21}
- Birectified pentacontatetrapeton (barm) (Jonathan Bowers)

=== Images ===
Vertices are colored by their multiplicity in this projection, in progressive order: red, orange, yellow, green, cyan, blue, purple, magenta, red-violet.

Coxeter plane orthographic projections
E6 [12]	D5 [8]	D4 / A2 [6]	B6 [12/2]
A5 [6]	A4 [5]	A3 / D3 [4]	

== Trirectified 1_{22} polytope ==
Trirectified 1_{22} polytope
Type	Uniform 6-polytope
Schläfli symbol	3r{3,3^{2,2}}
Coxeter symbol	3r(1_{22})
Coxeter-Dynkin diagram	or
5-faces	558
4-faces	4608
Cells	8640
Faces	6480
Edges	2160
Vertices	270
Vertex figure	
Coxeter group	E_{6}, [[3,3^{2,2}]], order 103680
Properties	convex

=== Alternate names ===
- Tricantellated 2_{21}
- Trirectified pentacontatetrapeton (Acronym: trim, old: cacam, tram, mak) (Jonathan Bowers)

== See also ==
- List of E6 polytopes

== Notes ==
Fundamental convex regular and uniform polytopes in dimensions 2–10
Family	A_{n}	B_{n}	I_{2}(p) / D_{n}	E_{6} / E_{7} / E_{8} / F_{4} / G_{2}	H_{n}
Regular polygon	Triangle	Square	p-gon	Hexagon	Pentagon
Uniform polyhedron	Tetrahedron	Octahedron • Cube	Demicube		Dodecahedron • Icosahedron
Uniform polychoron	Pentachoron	16-cell • Tesseract	Demitesseract	24-cell	120-cell • 600-cell
Uniform 5-polytope	5-simplex	5-orthoplex • 5-cube	5-demicube		
Uniform 6-polytope	6-simplex	6-orthoplex • 6-cube	6-demicube	1_{22} • 2_{21}	
Uniform 7-polytope	7-simplex	7-orthoplex • 7-cube	7-demicube	1_{32} • 2_{31} • 3_{21}	
Uniform 8-polytope	8-simplex	8-orthoplex • 8-cube	8-demicube	1_{42} • 2_{41} • 4_{21}	
Uniform 9-polytope	9-simplex	9-orthoplex • 9-cube	9-demicube		
Uniform 10-polytope	10-simplex	10-orthoplex • 10-cube	10-demicube		
Uniform n-polytope	n-simplex	n-orthoplex • n-cube	n-demicube	1_{k2} • 2_{k1} • k_{21}	n-pentagonal polytope
Topics: Polytope families • Regular polytope • List of regular polytopes and compounds • Polytope operations
