= Uniform k 21 polytope =

Geometric object

In geometry, a uniform k_{21} polytope is a polytope in k + 4 dimensions constructed from the E_{n} Coxeter group, and having only regular polytope facets. The family was named by their Coxeter symbol k_{21} by its bifurcating Coxeter–Dynkin diagram, with a single ring on the end of the k-node sequence.

Thorold Gosset discovered this family as a part of his 1900 enumeration of the regular and semiregular polytopes, and so they are sometimes called Gosset's semiregular figures. Gosset named them by their dimension from 5 to 9, for example the 5-ic semiregular figure.

== Family members ==
The sequence as identified by Gosset ends as an infinite tessellation (space-filling honeycomb) in 8-space, called the E8 lattice. (A final form was not discovered by Gosset and is called the E9 lattice: 6_{21}. It is a tessellation of hyperbolic 9-space constructed of ∞ 9-simplex and ∞ 9-orthoplex facets with all vertices at infinity.)

The family starts uniquely as 6-polytopes. The triangular prism and rectified 5-cell are included at the beginning for completeness. The demipenteract also exists in the demihypercube family.

They are also sometimes named by their symmetry group, like E6 polytope, although there are many uniform polytopes within the E_{6} symmetry.

The complete family of Gosset semiregular polytopes are:

1. triangular prism: −1_{21} (2 triangles and 3 square faces)
2. rectified 5-cell: 0_{21}, Tetroctahedric (5 tetrahedra and 5 octahedra cells)
3. demipenteract: 1_{21}, 5-ic semiregular figure (16 5-cell and 10 16-cell facets)
4. 2 21 polytope: 2_{21}, 6-ic semiregular figure (72 5-simplex and 27 5-orthoplex facets)
5. 3 21 polytope: 3_{21}, 7-ic semiregular figure (576 6-simplex and 126 6-orthoplex facets)
6. 4 21 polytope: 4_{21}, 8-ic semiregular figure (17280 7-simplex and 2160 7-orthoplex facets)
7. 5 21 honeycomb: 5_{21}, 9-ic semiregular check tessellates Euclidean 8-space (∞ 8-simplex and ∞ 8-orthoplex facets)
8. 6 21 honeycomb: 6_{21}, tessellates hyperbolic 9-space (∞ 9-simplex and ∞ 9-orthoplex facets)

Each polytope is constructed from (n − 1)-simplex and (n − 1)-orthoplex facets.

The orthoplex faces are constructed from the Coxeter group D_{n−1} and have a Schläfli symbol of {3^{1,n−1,1}} rather than the regular {3^{n−2},4}. This construction is an implication of two "facet types". Half the facets around each orthoplex ridge are attached to another orthoplex, and the others are attached to a simplex. In contrast, every simplex ridge is attached to an orthoplex.

Each has a vertex figure as the previous form. For example, the rectified 5-cell has a vertex figure as a triangular prism.

== Elements ==
Gosset semiregular figures
n-ic	k_{21}	Graph	Name Coxeter diagram	Facets		Elements							
n-ic	k_{21}	Graph	Name Coxeter diagram	(n − 1)-simplex {3^{n−2}}	(n − 1)-orthoplex {3^{n−4,1,1}}	Vertices	Edges	Faces	Cells	4-faces	5-faces	6-faces	7-faces
3-ic	−1_{21}		Triangular prism	2 triangles	3 squares	6	9	5					
4-ic	0_{21}		Rectified 5-cell	5 tetrahedron	5 octahedron	10	30	30	10				
5-ic	1_{21}		Demipenteract	16 5-cell	10 16-cell	16	80	160	120	26			
6-ic	2_{21}		2_{21} polytope	72 5-simplexes	27 5-orthoplexes	27	216	720	1080	648	99		
7-ic	3_{21}		3_{21} polytope	576 6-simplexes	126 6-orthoplexes	56	756	4032	10080	12096	6048	702	
8-ic	4_{21}		4_{21} polytope	17280 7-simplexes	2160 7-orthoplexes	240	6720	60480	241920	483840	483840	207360	19440
9-ic	5_{21}		5_{21} honeycomb	∞ 8-simplexes	∞ 8-orthoplexes	∞							
10-ic	6_{21}		6_{21} honeycomb	∞ 9-simplexes	∞ 9-orthoplexes	∞							

== See also ==
- Uniform 2_{k1} polytope family
- Uniform 1_{k2} polytope family

Fundamental convex regular and uniform polytopes in dimensions 2–10
Family	A_{n}	B_{n}	I_{2}(p) / D_{n}	E_{6} / E_{7} / E_{8} / F_{4} / G_{2}	H_{n}
Regular polygon	Triangle	Square	p-gon	Hexagon	Pentagon
Uniform polyhedron	Tetrahedron	Octahedron • Cube	Demicube		Dodecahedron • Icosahedron
Uniform polychoron	Pentachoron	16-cell • Tesseract	Demitesseract	24-cell	120-cell • 600-cell
Uniform 5-polytope	5-simplex	5-orthoplex • 5-cube	5-demicube		
Uniform 6-polytope	6-simplex	6-orthoplex • 6-cube	6-demicube	1_{22} • 2_{21}	
Uniform 7-polytope	7-simplex	7-orthoplex • 7-cube	7-demicube	1_{32} • 2_{31} • 3_{21}	
Uniform 8-polytope	8-simplex	8-orthoplex • 8-cube	8-demicube	1_{42} • 2_{41} • 4_{21}	
Uniform 9-polytope	9-simplex	9-orthoplex • 9-cube	9-demicube		
Uniform 10-polytope	10-simplex	10-orthoplex • 10-cube	10-demicube		
Uniform n-polytope	n-simplex	n-orthoplex • n-cube	n-demicube	1_{k2} • 2_{k1} • k_{21}	n-pentagonal polytope
Topics: Polytope families • Regular polytope • List of regular polytopes and compounds • Polytope operations

Fundamental convex regular and uniform honeycombs in dimensions 2–9
Space	Family	${\tilde{A}}_{n-1}$	${\tilde{C}}_{n-1}$	${\tilde{B}}_{n-1}$	${\tilde{D}}_{n-1}$	${\tilde{G}}_2$ / ${\tilde{F}}_4$ / ${\tilde{E}}_{n-1}$
E^{2}	Uniform tiling	0_{[3]}	δ_{3}	hδ_{3}	qδ_{3}	Hexagonal
E^{3}	Uniform convex honeycomb	0_{[4]}	δ_{4}	hδ_{4}	qδ_{4}	
E^{4}	Uniform 4-honeycomb	0_{[5]}	δ_{5}	hδ_{5}	qδ_{5}	24-cell honeycomb
E^{5}	Uniform 5-honeycomb	0_{[6]}	δ_{6}	hδ_{6}	qδ_{6}	
E^{6}	Uniform 6-honeycomb	0_{[7]}	δ_{7}	hδ_{7}	qδ_{7}	2_{22}
E^{7}	Uniform 7-honeycomb	0_{[8]}	δ_{8}	hδ_{8}	qδ_{8}	1_{33} • 3_{31}
E^{8}	Uniform 8-honeycomb	0_{[9]}	δ_{9}	hδ_{9}	qδ_{9}	1_{52} • 2_{51} • 5_{21}
E^{9}	Uniform 9-honeycomb	0_{[10]}	δ_{10}	hδ_{10}	qδ_{10}	
E^{10}	Uniform 10-honeycomb	0_{[11]}	δ_{11}	hδ_{11}	qδ_{11}	
E^{n−1}	Uniform (n−1)-honeycomb	0_{[n]}	δ_{n}	hδ_{n}	qδ_{n}	1_{k2} • 2_{k1} • k_{21}
