= Six-dimensional space =

Geometric space with six dimensions

Six-dimensional (6D) space is any space that has six dimensions, six degrees of freedom, and that needs six pieces of data, or coordinates, to specify a location in this space. There are an infinite number of these, but those of most interest are simpler ones that model some aspect of the environment. Of particular interest is six-dimensional Euclidean space, in which 6-polytopes and the 5-sphere are constructed. Six-dimensional elliptical space and hyperbolic spaces are also studied, with constant positive and negative curvature.

Formally, six-dimensional Euclidean space, $\mathbb{R}^{6}$, is generated by considering all real 6-tuples as 6-vectors in this space. As such it has the properties of all Euclidean spaces, so it is linear, has a metric and a full set of vector operations. In particular the dot product between two 6-vectors is readily defined and can be used to calculate the metric. 6 × 6 matrices can be used to describe transformations such as rotations that keep the origin fixed.

More generally, any space that can be described locally with six coordinates, not necessarily Euclidean ones, is six-dimensional. One example is the surface of the 6-sphere, S^{6}. This is the set of all points in seven-dimensional space (Euclidean) $\mathbb{R}^{7}$ that are a fixed distance from the origin. This constraint reduces the number of coordinates needed to describe a point on the 6-sphere by one, so it has six dimensions. Such non-Euclidean spaces are far more common than Euclidean spaces, and in six dimensions they have far more applications.

== Geometry ==
=== 6-polytope ===
A polytope in six dimensions is called a 6-polytope. The most studied are the regular polytopes, of which there are only three in six dimensions: the 6-simplex, 6-cube, and 6-orthoplex. A wider family are the uniform 6-polytopes, constructed from fundamental symmetry domains of reflection, each domain defined by a Coxeter group. Each uniform polytope is defined by a ringed Coxeter–Dynkin diagram. The 6-demicube is a unique polytope from the D_{6} family, and 2_{21} and 1_{22} polytopes from the E_{6} family.

Uniform polytopes in six dimensions (Displayed as orthogonal projections in each Coxeter plane of symmetry)
A_{6}	B_{6}		D_{6}	E_{6}	
6-simplex {3,3,3,3,3}	6-cube Hexeract {4,3,3,3,3}	6-orthoplex {3,3,3,3,4}	6-demicube Demihexeract = {3,3^{3,1}} = h{4,3,3,3,3}	2_{21} polytope = {3,3,3^{2,1}}	1_{22} polytope = {3,3^{2,2}}

=== 5-sphere ===
The 5-sphere, or hypersphere in six dimensions, is the five-dimensional surface equidistant from a point. It has symbol S^{5}, and the equation for the 5-sphere, radius r, centre the origin is

$$S^5 = \left\{ x \in \mathbb{R}^6 : \|x\| = r\right\}.$$

The volume of six-dimensional space bounded by this 5-sphere is

$$V_6 = \frac{\pi^3 r^6 }{6}$$

which is 5.16771 × r^{6}, or 0.0807 of the smallest 6-cube that contains the 5-sphere.

=== Icosahedral lattice symmetry ===
In six-dimensional Euclidean space, six mutually orthogonal axes may be drawn through any point. These form a group isomorphous with the six fivefold symmetry axes of the regular icosahedron, thus affording an icosahedrally symmetric projection into three-dimensional space. This projection plays a major role in the crystallography of icosahedral quasicrystals.

== Applications ==
=== Transformations in three dimensions ===
In three dimensional space a rigid transformation has six degrees of freedom, three translations along the three coordinate axes and three from the rotation group SO(3). Often these transformations are handled separately as they have very different geometrical structures, but there are ways of dealing with them that treat them as a single six-dimensional object.

==== Screw theory ====
In screw theory angular and linear velocity are combined into one six-dimensional object, called a twist. A similar object called a wrench combines forces and torques in six dimensions. These can be treated as six-dimensional vectors that transform linearly when changing frame of reference. Translations and rotations cannot be done this way, but are related to a twist by exponentiation.

==== Phase space ====
Phase portrait of the Van der Pol oscillator

Phase space is a space made up of the position and momentum of a particle, which can be plotted together in a phase diagram to highlight the relationship between the quantities. A general particle moving in three dimensions has a phase space with six dimensions, too many to plot but they can be analysed mathematically.

=== Rotations in four dimensions ===
The rotation group in four dimensions, SO(4), has six degrees of freedom. This can be seen by considering the 4 × 4 matrix that represents a rotation: as it is an orthogonal matrix the matrix is determined, up to a change in sign, by e.g. the six elements above the main diagonal. But this group is not linear, and it has a more complex structure than other applications seen so far.

Another way of looking at this group is with quaternion multiplication. Every rotation in four dimensions can be achieved by multiplying by a pair of unit quaternions, one before and one after the vector. These quaternion are unique, up to a change in sign for both of them, and generate all rotations when used this way, so the product of their groups, S^{3} × S^{3}, is a double cover of SO(4), which must have six dimensions.

Although the space we live in is considered three-dimensional, there are practical applications for four-dimensional space. Quaternions, one of the ways to describe rotations in three dimensions, consist of a four-dimensional space. Rotations between quaternions, for interpolation, for example, take place in four dimensions. Spacetime, which has three space dimensions and one time dimension is also four-dimensional, though with a different structure to Euclidean space.

=== Electromagnetism ===
In electromagnetism, the electromagnetic field is generally thought of as being made of two things, the electric field and magnetic field. They are both three-dimensional vector fields, related to each other by Maxwell's equations. A second approach is to combine them in a single object, the six-dimensional electromagnetic tensor, a tensor- or bivector-valued representation of the electromagnetic field. Using this Maxwell's equations can be condensed from four equations into a particularly compact single equation:

$$\partial \mathbf{F} = \mathbf{J} \,$$

where F is the bivector form of the electromagnetic tensor, J is the four-current and ∂ is a suitable differential operator. The six-dimensional real vector may be viewed as a three-dimensional complex vector called the Riemann–Silberstein vector, also yielding Maxwell's equations in a single expression.

=== String theory ===
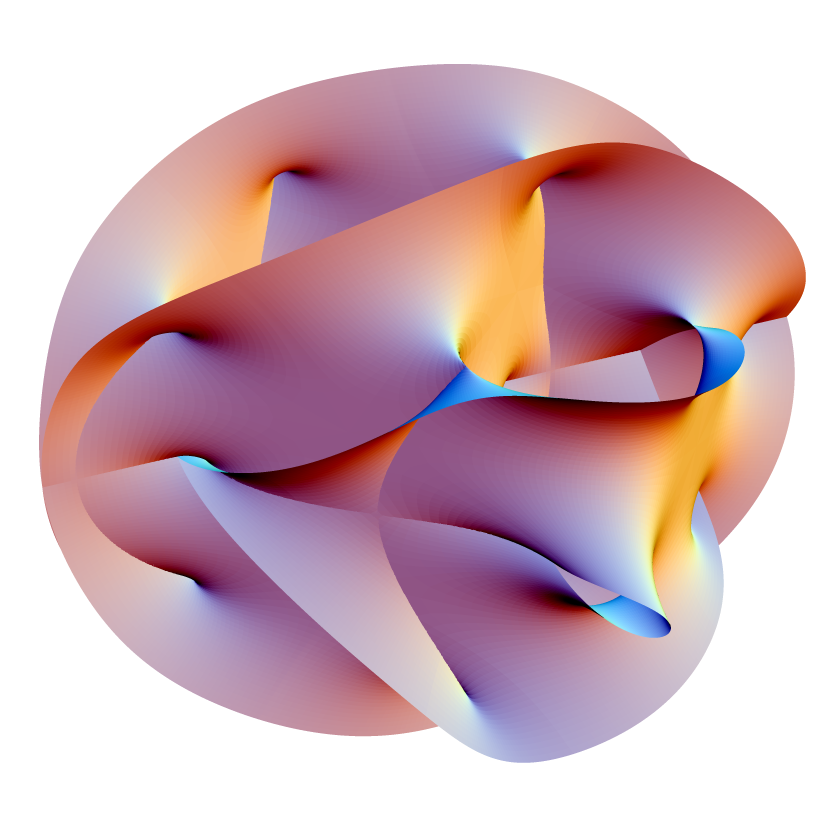
Calabi–Yau manifold (3D projection)

In physics string theory is an attempt to describe general relativity and quantum mechanics with a single mathematical model. Although it is an attempt to model our universe it takes place in a space with more dimensions than the four of spacetime that we are familiar with. In particular a number of string theories take place in a ten-dimensional space, adding an extra six dimensions. These extra dimensions are required by the theory, but as they cannot be observed are thought to be quite different, perhaps compactified to form a six-dimensional space with a particular geometry too small to be observable.

Since 1997 another string theory has come to light that works in six dimensions. Little string theories are non-gravitational string theories in five and six dimensions that arise when considering limits of ten-dimensional string theory.

== Theoretical background ==
=== Bivectors in four dimensions ===
A number of the above applications can be related to each other algebraically by considering the real, six-dimensional bivectors in four dimensions. These can be written $\Lambda^{2}\mathbb{R}^{4}$ for the set of bivectors in Euclidean space or $\Lambda^{2}\mathbb{R}^{3,1}$ for the set of bivectors in spacetime. The Plücker coordinates are bivectors in $\mathbb{R}^{4}$ while the electromagnetic tensor discussed in the previous section is a bivector in $\mathbb{R}^{3,1}$. Bivectors can be used to generate rotations in either $\mathbb{R}^{4}$ or $\mathbb{R}^{3,1}$ through the exponential map (e.g. applying the exponential map of all bivectors in $\Lambda^{2}\mathbb{R}^{4}$ generates all rotations in $\mathbb{R}^{4}$). They can also be related to general transformations in three dimensions through homogeneous coordinates, which can be thought of as modified rotations in $\mathbb{R}^{4}$.

The bivectors arise from sums of all possible wedge products between pairs of 4-vectors. They therefore have C4
2 = 6 components, and can be written most generally as

$$\mathbf{B} = B_{12}\mathbf{e}_{12} + B_{13}\mathbf{e}_{13} + B_{14}\mathbf{e}_{14} + B_{23}\mathbf{e}_{23} + B_{24}\mathbf{e}_{24} + B_{34}\mathbf{e}_{34}$$

They are the first bivectors that cannot all be generated by products of pairs of vectors. Those that can are simple bivectors and the rotations they generate are simple rotations. Other rotations in four dimensions are double and isoclinic rotations and correspond to non-simple bivectors that cannot be generated by single wedge product.

== 6-vectors ==
6-vectors are simply the vectors of six-dimensional Euclidean space. Like other such vectors they are linear, can be added subtracted and scaled like in other dimensions. Rather than use letters of the alphabet, higher dimensions usually use suffixes to designate dimensions, so a general six-dimensional vector can be written a = (a_{1}, a_{2}, a_{3}, a_{4}, a_{5}, a_{6}). Written like this the six basis vectors are (1, 0, 0, 0, 0, 0), (0, 1, 0, 0, 0, 0), (0, 0, 1, 0, 0, 0), (0, 0, 0, 1, 0, 0), (0, 0, 0, 0, 1, 0) and (0, 0, 0, 0, 0, 1).

Of the vector operators the cross product cannot be used in six dimensions; instead, the wedge product of two 6-vectors results in a bivector with 15 dimensions. The dot product of two vectors is

$$\mathbf{a} \cdot \mathbf{b} = a_1b_1 + a_2b_2 + a_3b_3 + a_4b_4 + a_5b_5 + a_6b_6.$$

It can be used to find the angle between two vectors and the norm,

$$\left | \mathbf{a} \right \vert = \sqrt{\mathbf{a} \cdot \mathbf{a}} = \sqrt{{a_1}^2 + {a_2}^2 + {a_3}^2 + {a_4}^2 + {a_5}^2 + {a_6}^2}.$$

This can be used for example to calculate the diagonal of a 6-cube; with one corner at the origin, edges aligned to the axes and side length 1 the opposite corner could be at (1, 1, 1, 1, 1, 1), the norm of which is

$$\sqrt{1 + 1 + 1 + 1 + 1 +1} = \sqrt{6} = 2.4495,$$

which is the length of the vector and so of the diagonal of the 6-cube.

=== Gibbs bivectors ===
In 1901 Edwin Bidwell Wilson published Vector Analysis based on lectures of J. W. Gibbs. Six real dimensions are expressed as complex bivectors, a tool used by Gibbs for electromagnetic theory. This six-dimensional structure expresses the Lie algebra of a representation of the Lorentz group.
