= Cross-polytope =

Regular polytope dual to the hypercube in any number of dimensions

Cross-polytopes of dimension 2 to 5
A 2-dimensional cross-polytope	A 3-dimensional cross-polytope
2 dimensions square	3 dimensions octahedron
A 4-dimensional cross-polytope	A 5-dimensional cross-polytope
4 dimensions 16-cell	5 dimensions 5-orthoplex

In geometry, a cross-polytope, hyperoctahedron, orthoplex, staurotope, or cocube is a regular, convex polytope that exists in n-dimensional Euclidean space. A 2-dimensional cross-polytope is a square, a 3-dimensional cross-polytope is a regular octahedron, and a 4-dimensional cross-polytope is a 16-cell. Its facets are simplexes of the previous dimension, while the cross-polytope's vertex figure is another cross-polytope from the previous dimension.

The vertices of a cross-polytope can be chosen as the unit vectors pointing along each co-ordinate axis – i.e. all the permutations of (±1, 0, 0, ..., 0). The cross-polytope is the convex hull of its vertices. The n-dimensional cross-polytope can also be defined as the closed unit ball (or, according to some authors, its boundary) in the ℓ_{1}-norm on R^{n}, those points x = (x_{1}, x_{2}..., x_{n}) satisfying

$$|x_1| + |x_2| + \cdots + |x_n| \le 1.$$

An n-orthoplex can be constructed as a bipyramid with an (n−1)-orthoplex base.

The cross-polytope is the dual polytope of the hypercube. The vertex-edge graph of an n-dimensional cross-polytope is the Turán graph T(2n, n) (also known as a cocktail party graph).

== Low-dimensional examples ==
In 1 dimension the cross-polytope is a line segment, which can be chosen as the interval [−1, +1].

In 2 dimensions the cross-polytope is a square. If the vertices are chosen as {(±1, 0), (0, ±1)}, the square's sides are at right angles to the axes; in this orientation a square is often called a diamond.

In 3 dimensions the cross-polytope is a regular octahedron—one of the five convex regular polyhedra known as the Platonic solids.

The 4-dimensional cross-polytope also goes by the name hexadecachoron or 16-cell. It is one of the six convex regular 4-polytopes. These 4-polytopes were first described by the Swiss mathematician Ludwig Schläfli in the mid-19th century. The vertices of the 4-dimensional hypercube, or tesseract, can be divided into two sets of eight, the convex hull of each set forming a cross-polytope. Moreover, the polytope known as the 24-cell can be constructed by symmetrically arranging three cross-polytopes.

== n dimensions ==
The cross-polytope family is one of three regular polytope families, labeled by Coxeter as β_{n}, the other two being the hypercube family, labeled as γ_{n}, and the simplex family, labeled as α_{n}. A fourth family, the infinite tessellations of hypercubes, he labeled as δ_{n}.

The n-dimensional cross-polytope has 2n vertices, and 2^{n} facets ((n − 1)-dimensional components) all of which are (n − 1)-simplices. The vertex figures are all (n − 1)-cross-polytopes. The Schläfli symbol of the cross-polytope is {3,3,...,3,4}.

The dihedral angle of the n-dimensional cross-polytope is $\delta_n = \arccos\left(\frac{2-n}{n}\right)$. This gives: δ_{2} = arccos(0/2) = 90°, δ_{3} = arccos(−1/3) = 109.47°, δ_{4} = arccos(−2/4) = 120°, δ_{5} = arccos(−3/5) = 126.87°, ... δ_{∞} = arccos(−1) = 180°.

The hypervolume of the n-dimensional cross-polytope is

$$\frac{2^n}{n!}.$$

For each pair of non-opposite vertices, there is an edge joining them. More generally, each set of k + 1 orthogonal vertices corresponds to a distinct k-dimensional component which contains them. The number of k-dimensional components (vertices, edges, faces, ..., facets) in an n-dimensional cross-polytope is thus given by (see binomial coefficient):

$2^{k+1}{n \choose {k+1}}$

The extended f-vector for an n-orthoplex can be computed by (1,2)^{n}, like the coefficients of polynomial products. For example a 16-cell is (1,2)^{4} = (1,4,4)^{2} = (1,8,24,32,16).

There are many possible orthographic projections that can show the cross-polytopes as 2-dimensional graphs. Petrie polygon projections map the points into a regular 2n-gon or lower order regular polygons. A second projection takes the 2(n−1)-gon petrie polygon of the lower dimension, seen as a bipyramid, projected down the axis, with 2 vertices mapped into the center.

Cross-polytope elements
n	β_{n} k_{11}	Name(s) Graph	Graph 2n-gon	Schläfli	Coxeter-Dynkin diagrams	Vertices	Edges	Faces	Cells	4-faces	5-faces	6-faces
0	β_{0}	Point; 0-orthoplex		( )		1						
1	β_{1}	Line segment 1-orthoplex		{ }		2	1					
2	β_{2} −1_{11}	Square; 2-orthoplex Bicross		{4} 2{ } = { }+{ }		4	4	1				
3	β_{3} 0_{11}	Octahedron; 3-orthoplex Tricross		{3,4} {3^{1,1}} 3{ }		6	12	8	1			
4	β_{4} 1_{11}	16-cell 4-orthoplex Tetracross		{3,3,4} {3,3^{1,1}} 4{ }		8	24	32	16	1		
5	β_{5} 2_{11}	5-orthoplex Pentacross		{3^{3},4} {3,3,3^{1,1}} 5{ }		10	40	80	80	32	1	
6	β_{6} 3_{11}	6-orthoplex Hexacross		{3^{4},4} {3^{3},3^{1,1}} 6{ }		12	60	160	240	192	64	1
...
n	β_{n} (n−3)_{11}	n-orthoplex n-cross		{3^{n − 2},4} {3^{n − 3},3^{1,1}} n{}	.........	2n 0-faces, ... $2^{k+1}{n\choose k+1}$ k-faces ..., 2^{n} (n−1)-faces						

The vertices of an axis-aligned cross polytope are all at equal distance from each other in the Manhattan distance (L^{1} norm). Kusner's conjecture states that this set of 2d points is the largest possible equidistant set for this distance.

== Generalized orthoplex ==
Regular complex polytopes can be defined in complex Hilbert space called generalized orthoplexes (or cross polytopes), β^{p}_{n} = _{2}{3}_{2}{3}..._{2}{4}_{p}, or... Real solutions exist with p = 2, i.e. β^{2}_{n} = β_{n} = _{2}{3}_{2}{3}..._{2}{4}_{2} = {3,3,..,4}. For p > 2, they exist in $\mathbb{\Complex}^n$. A p-generalized n-orthoplex has pn vertices. Generalized orthoplexes have regular simplexes (real) as facets. Generalized orthoplexes make complete multipartite graphs, β^{p}_{2} make K_{p,p} for complete bipartite graph, β^{p}_{3} make K_{p,p,p} for complete tripartite graphs β^{p}_{n} creates K_{p^{n}} or Turán graphs $T(np,n)$. An orthogonal projection can be defined that maps all the vertices equally-spaced on a circle, with all pairs of vertices connected, except multiples of n. The regular polygon perimeter in these orthogonal projections is called a petrie polygon.

Generalized orthoplexes
	p = 2		p = 3	p = 4	p = 5	p = 6	p = 7	p = 8
$\mathbb{R}^2$	_{2}{4}_{2} = {4} = K_{2,2}	$\mathbb{\Complex}^2$	_{2}{4}_{3} = K_{3,3}	_{2}{4}_{4} = K_{4,4}	_{2}{4}_{5} = K_{5,5}	_{2}{4}_{6} = K_{6,6}	_{2}{4}_{7} = K_{7,7}	_{2}{4}_{8} = K_{8,8}
$\mathbb{R}^3$	_{2}{3}_{2}{4}_{2} = {3,4} = K_{2,2,2}	$\mathbb{\Complex}^3$	_{2}{3}_{2}{4}_{3} = K_{3,3,3}	_{2}{3}_{2}{4}_{4} = K_{4,4,4}	_{2}{3}_{2}{4}_{5} = K_{5,5,5}	_{2}{3}_{2}{4}_{6} = K_{6,6,6}	_{2}{3}_{2}{4}_{7} = K_{7,7,7}	_{2}{3}_{2}{4}_{8} = K_{8,8,8}
$\mathbb{R}^4$	_{2}{3}_{2}{3}_{2} {3,3,4} = K_{2,2,2,2}	$\mathbb{\Complex}^4$	_{2}{3}_{2}{3}_{2}{4}_{3} K_{3,3,3,3}	_{2}{3}_{2}{3}_{2}{4}_{4} K_{4,4,4,4}	_{2}{3}_{2}{3}_{2}{4}_{5} K_{5,5,5,5}	_{2}{3}_{2}{3}_{2}{4}_{6} K_{6,6,6,6}	_{2}{3}_{2}{3}_{2}{4}_{7} K_{7,7,7,7}	_{2}{3}_{2}{3}_{2}{4}_{8} K_{8,8,8,8}
$\mathbb{R}^5$	_{2}{3}_{2}{3}_{2}{3}_{2}{4}_{2} {3,3,3,4} = K_{2,2,2,2,2}	$\mathbb{\Complex}^5$	_{2}{3}_{2}{3}_{2}{3}_{2}{4}_{3} K_{3,3,3,3,3}	_{2}{3}_{2}{3}_{2}{3}_{2}{4}_{4} K_{4,4,4,4,4}	_{2}{3}_{2}{3}_{2}{3}_{2}{4}_{5} K_{5,5,5,5,5}	_{2}{3}_{2}{3}_{2}{3}_{2}{4}_{6} K_{6,6,6,6,6}	_{2}{3}_{2}{3}_{2}{3}_{2}{4}_{7} K_{7,7,7,7,7}	_{2}{3}_{2}{3}_{2}{3}_{2}{4}_{8} K_{8,8,8,8,8}
$\mathbb{R}^6$	_{2}{3}_{2}{3}_{2}{3}_{2}{3}_{2}{4}_{2} {3,3,3,3,4} = K_{2,2,2,2,2,2}	$\mathbb{\Complex}^6$	_{2}{3}_{2}{3}_{2}{3}_{2}{3}_{2}{4}_{3} K_{3,3,3,3,3,3}	_{2}{3}_{2}{3}_{2}{3}_{2}{3}_{2}{4}_{4} K_{4,4,4,4,4,4}	_{2}{3}_{2}{3}_{2}{3}_{2}{3}_{2}{4}_{5} K_{5,5,5,5,5,5}	_{2}{3}_{2}{3}_{2}{3}_{2}{3}_{2}{4}_{6} K_{6,6,6,6,6,6}	_{2}{3}_{2}{3}_{2}{3}_{2}{3}_{2}{4}_{7} K_{7,7,7,7,7,7}	_{2}{3}_{2}{3}_{2}{3}_{2}{3}_{2}{4}_{8} K_{8,8,8,8,8,8}

== Related polytope families ==
Cross-polytopes can be combined with their dual cubes to form compound polytopes:

- In two dimensions, we obtain the octagrammic star figure {8/2},
- In three dimensions we obtain the compound of cube and octahedron,
- In four dimensions we obtain the compound of tesseract and 16-cell.

== See also ==
- List of regular polytopes
- Hyperoctahedral group, the symmetry group of the cross-polytope

== Citations ==
Fundamental convex regular and uniform polytopes in dimensions 2–10
Family	A_{n}	B_{n}	I_{2}(p) / D_{n}	E_{6} / E_{7} / E_{8} / F_{4} / G_{2}	H_{n}
Regular polygon	Triangle	Square	p-gon	Hexagon	Pentagon
Uniform polyhedron	Tetrahedron	Octahedron • Cube	Demicube		Dodecahedron • Icosahedron
Uniform polychoron	Pentachoron	16-cell • Tesseract	Demitesseract	24-cell	120-cell • 600-cell
Uniform 5-polytope	5-simplex	5-orthoplex • 5-cube	5-demicube		
Uniform 6-polytope	6-simplex	6-orthoplex • 6-cube	6-demicube	1_{22} • 2_{21}	
Uniform 7-polytope	7-simplex	7-orthoplex • 7-cube	7-demicube	1_{32} • 2_{31} • 3_{21}	
Uniform 8-polytope	8-simplex	8-orthoplex • 8-cube	8-demicube	1_{42} • 2_{41} • 4_{21}	
Uniform 9-polytope	9-simplex	9-orthoplex • 9-cube	9-demicube		
Uniform 10-polytope	10-simplex	10-orthoplex • 10-cube	10-demicube		
Uniform n-polytope	n-simplex	n-orthoplex • n-cube	n-demicube	1_{k2} • 2_{k1} • k_{21}	n-pentagonal polytope
Topics: Polytope families • Regular polytope • List of regular polytopes and compounds • Polytope operations
