= Demihypercube =

Polytope constructed from alternation of a hypercube

Alternation of the n-cube yields one of two n-demicubes, as in this 3-dimensional illustration of the two tetrahedra that arise as the 3-demicubes of the 3-cube.

In geometry, demihypercubes (also called n-demicubes, n-hemicubes, and half measure polytopes) are a class of n-polytopes constructed from alternation of an n-hypercube, labeled as hγ_{n} for being half of the hypercube family, γ_{n}. Half of the vertices are deleted and new facets are formed. The 2n facets become 2n (n − 1)-demicubes, and 2^{n - 1} (n − 1)-simplex facets are formed in place of the deleted vertices.

They have been named with a demi- prefix to each hypercube name: demicube, demitesseract, etc. The demicube is identical to the regular tetrahedron, and the demitesseract is identical to the regular 16-cell. The demipenteract is considered semiregular for having only regular facets. Higher forms do not have all regular facets but are all uniform polytopes.

The vertex-edge graph of the demihypercube is the halved cube graph.

An n-demicube has inversion symmetry if n is even.

== Discovery ==
Thorold Gosset described the demipenteract in his 1900 publication listing all of the regular and semiregular figures in n-dimensions above three. He called it a 5-ic semi-regular. It also exists within the semiregular k_{21} polytope family.

The demihypercubes can be represented by extended Schläfli symbols of the form h{4,3,...,3} as half the vertices of {4,3,...,3}. The vertex figures of demihypercubes are rectified n-simplexes.

== Constructions ==
They are represented by Coxeter-Dynkin diagrams of three constructive forms:

1. ... (As an alternated orthotope) s{2^{1,1,...,1}}
2. ... (As an alternated hypercube) h{4,3^{n−1}}
3. .... (As a demihypercube) {3^{1,n−3,1}}

H.S.M. Coxeter also labeled the third bifurcating diagrams as 1_{k1} representing the lengths of the three branches and led by the ringed branch.

An n-demicube, n greater than 2, has n(n − 1)/2 edges meeting at each vertex. The graphs below show less edges at each vertex due to overlapping edges in the symmetry projection.

n	1_{k1}	Coxeter plane projection	Schläfli symbol	Coxeter diagrams A_{1}^{n} B_{n} D_{n}	Elements										Facets: Demihypercubes & Simplexes	Vertex figure
n	1_{k1}	Coxeter plane projection	Schläfli symbol	Coxeter diagrams A_{1}^{n} B_{n} D_{n}	Vertices	Edges	Faces	Cells	4-faces	5-faces	6-faces	7-faces	8-faces	9-faces	Facets: Demihypercubes & Simplexes	Vertex figure
2	1_{−1,1}	demisquare (digon)	s{2} h{4} {3^{1,−1,1}}		2	2									2 edges	--
3	1_{01}	demicube (tetrahedron)	s{2^{1,1}} h{4,3} {3^{1,0,1}}		4	6	4								(6 digons); 4 triangles	Triangle (Rectified triangle)
4	1_{11}	demitesseract (16-cell)	s{2^{1,1,1}} h{4,3,3} {3^{1,1,1}}		8	24	32	16							8 demicubes (tetrahedra); 8 tetrahedra	Octahedron (Rectified tetrahedron)
5	1_{21}	demipenteract	s{2^{1,1,1,1}} h{4,3^{3}}{3^{1,2,1}}		16	80	160	120	26						10 16-cells 16 5-cells	Rectified 5-cell
6	1_{31}	demihexeract	s{2^{1,1,1,1,1}} h{4,3^{4}}{3^{1,3,1}}		32	240	640	640	252	44					12 demipenteracts 32 5-simplices	Rectified hexateron
7	1_{41}	demihepteract	s{2^{1,1,1,1,1,1}} h{4,3^{5}}{3^{1,4,1}}		64	672	2240	2800	1624	532	78				14 demihexeracts 64 6-simplices	Rectified 6-simplex
8	1_{51}	demiocteract	s{2^{1,1,1,1,1,1,1}} h{4,3^{6}}{3^{1,5,1}}		128	1792	7168	10752	8288	4032	1136	144			16 demihepteracts 128 7-simplices	Rectified 7-simplex
9	1_{61}	demienneract	s{2^{1,1,1,1,1,1,1,1}} h{4,3^{7}}{3^{1,6,1}}		256	4608	21504	37632	36288	23520	9888	2448	274		18 demiocteracts 256 8-simplices	Rectified 8-simplex
10	1_{71}	demidekeract	s{2^{1,1,1,1,1,1,1,1,1}} h{4,3^{8}}{3^{1,7,1}}		512	11520	61440	122880	142464	115584	64800	24000	5300	532	20 demienneracts 512 9-simplices	Rectified 9-simplex
...
n	1_{n−3,1}	n-demicube	s{2^{1,1,...,1}} h{4,3^{n−2}}{3^{1,n−3,1}}	.........	2^{n−1}										2n (n − 1)-demicubes 2^{n−1} (n − 1)-simplices	Rectified (n − 1)-simplex

In general, a demicube's elements can be determined from the original n-cube: (with C_{n,m} = m^{th}-face count in n-cube = 2^{n−m} n!/(m!(n − m)!))

- Vertices: D_{n,0} = 1/2 C_{n,0} = 2^{n−1} (Half the n-cube vertices remain)
- Edges: D_{n,1} = C_{n,2} = 1/2 n(n – 1) 2^{n−2} (All original edges lost, each square faces create a new edge)
- Faces: D_{n,2} = 4 * C_{n,3} = 2/3 n(n − 1)(n − 2) 2^{n−3} (All original faces lost, each cube creates 4 new triangular faces)
- Cells: D_{n,3} = C_{n,3} + 2^{3} C_{n,4} (tetrahedra from original cells plus new ones)
- Hypercells: D_{n,4} = C_{n,4} + 2^{4} C_{n,5} (16-cells and 5-cells respectively)
- ...
- [For m = 3, ... , n − 1]: D_{n,m} = C_{n,m} + 2^{m} C_{n,m+1} (m-demicubes and m-simplexes respectively)
- ...
- Facets: D_{n,n−1} = 2n + 2^{n−1} ((n − 1)-demicubes and (n − 1)-simplices respectively)

== Symmetry group ==
The stabilizer of the demihypercube in the hyperoctahedral group (the Coxeter group $BC_n$ [4,3^{n−1}]) has index 2. It is the Coxeter group $D_n,$ [3^{n−3,1,1}] of order $2^{n-1}n!$, and is generated by permutations of the coordinate axes and reflections along pairs of coordinate axes.

== Orthotopic constructions ==
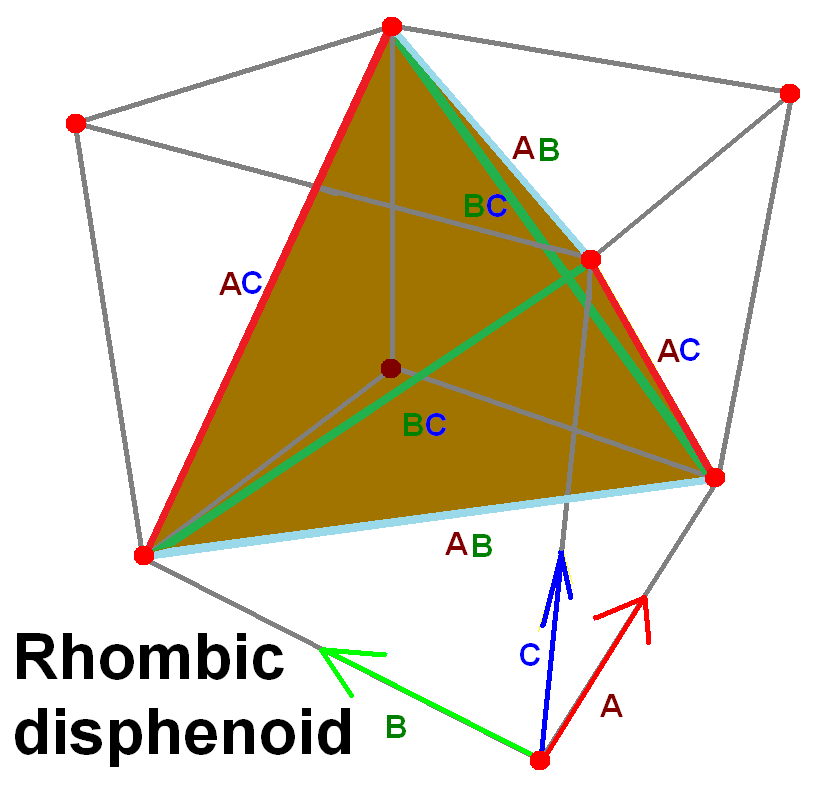
The rhombic disphenoid inside of a cuboid

Constructions as alternated orthotopes have the same topology, but can be stretched with different lengths in n-axes of symmetry.

The rhombic disphenoid is the three-dimensional example as alternated cuboid. It has three sets of edge lengths, and scalene triangle faces.

== See also ==
- Hypercube honeycomb
- Semiregular E-polytope

Fundamental convex regular and uniform polytopes
Family	A_{n}	B_{n}	I_{2}(p) / D_{n}	E_{6} / E_{7} / E_{8} / F_{4} / G_{2}	H_{n}
Regular polygon	Triangle	Square	p-gon	Hexagon	Pentagon
Uniform polyhedron	Tetrahedron	Octahedron • Cube	Demicube		Dodecahedron • Icosahedron
Uniform polychoron	Pentachoron	16-cell • Tesseract	Demitesseract	24-cell	120-cell • 600-cell
Uniform 5-polytope	5-simplex	5-orthoplex • 5-cube	5-demicube		
Uniform 6-polytope	6-simplex	6-orthoplex • 6-cube	6-demicube	1_{22} • 2_{21}	
Uniform 7-polytope	7-simplex	7-orthoplex • 7-cube	7-demicube	1_{32} • 2_{31} • 3_{21}	
Uniform 8-polytope	8-simplex	8-orthoplex • 8-cube	8-demicube	1_{42} • 2_{41} • 4_{21}	
Uniform n-polytope	n-simplex	n-orthoplex • n-cube	n-demicube	1_{k2} • 2_{k1} • k_{21}	n-pentagonal polytope
Topics: Polytope families • Regular polytope • List of regular polytopes and compounds • Polytope operations
