= Thorold Gosset =

English lawyer and mathematician (1869–1962)

John Herbert de Paz Thorold Gosset (16 October 1869 – December 1962) was an English lawyer and an amateur mathematician. In mathematics, he is noted for discovering and classifying the semiregular polytopes in dimensions four and higher, and for his generalization of Descartes' theorem on tangent circles to four and higher dimensions.

== Biography ==
Thorold Gosset was born in Thames Ditton, the son of John Jackson Gosset, a civil servant and statistical officer for HM Customs, and his wife Eleanor Gosset (formerly Thorold). He was admitted to Pembroke College, Cambridge as a pensioner on 1 October 1888, graduated BA in 1891, was called to the bar of the Inner Temple in June 1895, and graduated LLM in 1896. In 1900 he married Emily Florence Wood, and they subsequently had two children, named Kathleen and John.

== Mathematics ==
According to H. S. M. Coxeter, after obtaining his law degree in 1896 and having no clients, Gosset amused himself by attempting to classify the regular polytopes in higher-dimensional (greater than three) Euclidean space. After rediscovering all of them, he attempted to classify the "semi-regular polytopes", which he defined as polytopes having regular facets and which are vertex-uniform, as well as the analogous honeycombs, which he regarded as degenerate polytopes. In 1897 he submitted his results to James W. Glaisher, then editor of the journal Messenger of Mathematics. Glaisher was favourably impressed and passed the results on to William Burnside and Alfred Whitehead. Burnside, however, stated in a letter to Glaisher in 1899 that "the author's method, a sort of geometric intuition" did not appeal to him. He admitted that he never found the time to read more than the first half of Gosset's paper. In the end Glaisher published only a brief abstract of Gosset's results.

Gosset's results went largely unnoticed for many years. His semiregular polytopes were rediscovered by Elte in 1912 and later by H.S.M. Coxeter who gave both Gosset and Elte due credit.

Coxeter introduced the term Gosset polytopes for three semiregular polytopes in 6, 7, and 8 dimensions discovered by Gosset: the 2_{21}, 3_{21}, and 4_{21} polytopes. The vertices of these polytopes were later seen to arise as the roots of the exceptional Lie algebras E_{6}, E_{7} and E_{8}.

A new and more precise definition of the Gosset Series of polytopes has been given by Conway in 2008.

== See also ==
- Gosset graph
- Scott Vorthmann with David Richter in this article are displaying and presenting computerized vZome images of Gosset's Polytopes built with vZome program and which are including the 3_{21} polytope of Coxeter of 27 nodes which interested Pierre Etevenon in France.
