= H4 polytope =

Four-dimensional geometric objects

120-cell	600-cell

In 4-dimensional geometry, there are 15 uniform polytopes with H_{4} symmetry. Two of these, the 120-cell and 600-cell, are regular.

== Visualizations ==
Each can be visualized as symmetric orthographic projections in Coxeter planes of the H_{4} Coxeter group, and other subgroups.

The 3D picture are drawn as Schlegel diagram projections, centered on the cell at pos. 3, with a consistent orientation, and the 5 cells at position 0 are shown solid.

#	Name	Coxeter plane projections						Schlegel diagrams		Net
#	Name	F4 [12]	[20]	H4 [30]	H3 [10]	A3 [4]	A2 [3]	Dodecahedron centered	Tetrahedron centered	Net
1	120-cell {5,3,3}									
2	rectified 120-cell r{5,3,3}									
3	rectified 600-cell r{3,3,5}									
4	600-cell {3,3,5}									
5	truncated 120-cell t{5,3,3}									
6	cantellated 120-cell rr{5,3,3}									
7	runcinated 120-cell (also runcinated 600-cell) t_{0,3}{5,3,3}									
8	bitruncated 120-cell (also bitruncated 600-cell) t_{1,2}{5,3,3}									
9	cantellated 600-cell t_{0,2}{3,3,5}									
10	truncated 600-cell t{3,3,5}									
11	cantitruncated 120-cell tr{5,3,3}									
12	runcitruncated 120-cell t_{0,1,3}{5,3,3}									
13	runcitruncated 600-cell t_{0,1,3}{3,3,5}									
14	cantitruncated 600-cell tr{3,3,5}									
15	omnitruncated 120-cell (also omnitruncated 600-cell) t_{0,1,2,3}{5,3,3}									

Diminished forms
#	Name	Coxeter plane projections						Schlegel diagrams		Net
#	Name	F4 [12]	[20]	H4 [30]	H3 [10]	A3 [4]	A2 [3]	Dodecahedron centered	Tetrahedron centered	Net
16	20-diminished 600-cell (grand antiprism)									
17	24-diminished 600-cell (snub 24-cell)									
18 Nonuniform	Bi-24-diminished 600-cell									
19 Nonuniform	120-diminished rectified 600-cell									

== Coordinates ==
The coordinates of uniform polytopes from the H_{4} family are complicated. The regular ones can be expressed in terms of the golden ratio φ = (1 + √5)/2 and σ = (3√5 + 1)/2. Coxeter expressed them as 5-dimensional coordinates.

n	120-cell	600-cell
4D	The 600 vertices of the 120-cell include all permutations of (0, 0, ±2, ±2) (±1, ±1, ±1, ±√5) (±φ^{−2}, ±φ, ±φ, ±φ) (±φ^{−1}, ±φ^{−1}, ±φ^{−1}, ±φ^{2}) and all even permutations of (0, ±φ^{−2}, ±1, ±φ^{2}) (0, ±φ^{−1}, ±φ, ±√5) (±φ^{−1}, ±1, ±φ, ±2)	The vertices of a 600-cell centered at the origin of 4-space, with edges of length 1/φ (where φ = (1+√5)/2 is the golden ratio), can be given as follows: 16 vertices of the form 1/2 (±1, ±1, ±1, ±1), and 8 vertices obtained from (0, 0, 0, ±1) by permuting coordinates. The remaining 96 vertices are obtained by taking even permutations of 1/2 (±φ, ±1, ±1/φ, 0).
5D	Zero-sum permutation: (30): √5 (1, 1, 0, −1, −1) (10): ±(4, −1, −1, −1, −1) (40): ±(φ^{−1}, φ^{−1}, φ^{−1}, 2, −σ) (40): ±(φ, φ, φ, −2, −(σ−1)) (120): ±√5 (φ, 0, 0, φ^{−1}, −1) (120): ±(2, 2, φ^{−1}√5, −φ, −3) (240): ±(φ^{2}, 2φ^{−1}, φ^{−2}, −1, −2φ)	Zero-sum permutation: (20): √5 (1, 0, 0, 0, −1) (40): ±(φ^{2}, φ^{−2}, −1, −1, −1) (60): ±(2, φ^{−1}, φ^{−1}, −φ, −φ)

== Notes ==
Fundamental convex regular and uniform polytopes
Family	A_{n}	B_{n}	I_{2}(p) / D_{n}	E_{6} / E_{7} / E_{8} / F_{4} / G_{2}	H_{n}
Regular polygon	Triangle	Square	p-gon	Hexagon	Pentagon
Uniform polyhedron	Tetrahedron	Octahedron • Cube	Demicube		Dodecahedron • Icosahedron
Uniform polychoron	Pentachoron	16-cell • Tesseract	Demitesseract	24-cell	120-cell • 600-cell
Uniform 5-polytope	5-simplex	5-orthoplex • 5-cube	5-demicube		
Uniform 6-polytope	6-simplex	6-orthoplex • 6-cube	6-demicube	1_{22} • 2_{21}	
Uniform 7-polytope	7-simplex	7-orthoplex • 7-cube	7-demicube	1_{32} • 2_{31} • 3_{21}	
Uniform 8-polytope	8-simplex	8-orthoplex • 8-cube	8-demicube	1_{42} • 2_{41} • 4_{21}	
Uniform n-polytope	n-simplex	n-orthoplex • n-cube	n-demicube	1_{k2} • 2_{k1} • k_{21}	n-pentagonal polytope
Topics: Polytope families • Regular polytope • List of regular polytopes and compounds • Polytope operations
