= Rectified 6-simplexes =

| 6-simplex | Rectified 6-simplex | Birectified 6-simplex |
Orthogonal projections in A_{6} Coxeter plane

In six-dimensional geometry, a rectified 6-simplex is a convex uniform 6-polytope, being a rectification of the regular 6-simplex.

There are three unique degrees of rectifications, including the zeroth, the 6-simplex itself. Vertices of the rectified 6-simplex are located at the edge-centers of the 6-simplex. Vertices of the birectified 6-simplex are located in the triangular face centers of the 6-simplex.

== Rectified 6-simplex ==
Rectified 6-simplex
| Type | uniform polypeton |
| Schläfli symbol | t_{1}{3^{5}} r{3^{5}} = {3^{4,1}} or $\left\{\begin{array}{l}3, 3, 3, 3\\3\end{array}\right\}$ |
| Coxeter diagrams | |
| Elements | f_{5} = 14, f_{4} = 63, C = 140, F = 175, E = 105, V = 21 (χ=0) |
| Coxeter group | A_{6}, [3^{5}], order 5040 |
| Bowers name and (acronym) | Rectified heptapeton (ril) |
| Vertex figure | 5-cell prism |
| Circumradius | 0.845154 |
| Properties | convex, isogonal |

E. L. Elte identified it in 1912 as a semiregular polytope, labeling it as S^{1}_{6}. It is also called 0_{4,1} for its branching Coxeter-Dynkin diagram, shown as.

=== Alternate names ===
- Rectified heptapeton (Acronym: ril) (Jonathan Bowers)

=== Coordinates ===
The vertices of the rectified 6-simplex can be most simply positioned in 7-space as permutations of (0,0,0,0,0,1,1). This construction is based on facets of the rectified 7-orthoplex.

=== Images ===
Orthographic projections
| A_{k} Coxeter plane | A_{6} | A_{5} | A_{4} |
|---|---|---|---|
| Graph | | | |
| Dihedral symmetry | [7] | [6] | [5] |
| A_{k} Coxeter plane | A_{3} | A_{2} | |
| Graph | | | |
| Dihedral symmetry | [4] | [3] | |

== Birectified 6-simplex ==
Birectified 6-simplex
| Type | uniform 6-polytope |
| Class | A6 polytope |
| Schläfli symbol | t_{2}{3,3,3,3,3} 2r{3^{5}} = {3^{3,2}} or $\left\{\begin{array}{l}3, 3, 3\\3, 3\end{array}\right\}$ |
| Coxeter symbol | 0_{32} |
| Coxeter diagrams | |
| 5-faces | 14 total: 7 t_{1}{3,3,3,3} 7 t_{2}{3,3,3,3} |
| 4-faces | 84 |
| Cells | 245 |
| Faces | 350 |
| Edges | 210 |
| Vertices | 35 |
| Vertex figure | {3}x{3,3} |
| Petrie polygon | Heptagon |
| Coxeter groups | A_{6}, [3,3,3,3,3] |
| Properties | convex |

E. L. Elte identified it in 1912 as a semiregular polytope, labeling it as S^{2}_{6}. It is also called 0_{3,2} for its branching Coxeter-Dynkin diagram, shown as.

=== Alternate names ===
- Birectified heptapeton (Acronym: bril) (Jonathan Bowers)

=== Coordinates ===
The vertices of the birectified 6-simplex can be most simply positioned in 7-space as permutations of (0,0,0,0,1,1,1). This construction is based on facets of the birectified 7-orthoplex.

=== Images ===
Orthographic projections
| A_{k} Coxeter plane | A_{6} | A_{5} | A_{4} |
|---|---|---|---|
| Graph | | | |
| Dihedral symmetry | [7] | [6] | [5] |
| A_{k} Coxeter plane | A_{3} | A_{2} | |
| Graph | | | |
| Dihedral symmetry | [4] | [3] | |

== Related uniform 6-polytopes ==
The rectified 6-simplex polytope is the vertex figure of the 7-demicube, and the edge figure of the uniform 2_{41} polytope.

These polytopes are a part of 35 uniform 6-polytopes based on the [3,3,3,3,3] Coxeter group, all shown here in A_{6} Coxeter plane orthographic projections.

A6 polytopes
| t_{0} | t_{1} | t_{2} | t_{0,1} | t_{0,2} | t_{1,2} | t_{0,3} | t_{1,3} | t_{2,3} |
| t_{0,4} | t_{1,4} | t_{0,5} | t_{0,1,2} | t_{0,1,3} | t_{0,2,3} | t_{1,2,3} | t_{0,1,4} | t_{0,2,4} |
| t_{1,2,4} | t_{0,3,4} | t_{0,1,5} | t_{0,2,5} | t_{0,1,2,3} | t_{0,1,2,4} | t_{0,1,3,4} | t_{0,2,3,4} | t_{1,2,3,4} |
| t_{0,1,2,5} | t_{0,1,3,5} | t_{0,2,3,5} | t_{0,1,4,5} | t_{0,1,2,3,4} | t_{0,1,2,3,5} | t_{0,1,2,4,5} | t_{0,1,2,3,4,5} | |

== Notes ==
Fundamental convex regular and uniform polytopes in dimensions 2–10
| Family | A_{n} | B_{n} | I_{2}(p) / D_{n} | E_{6} / E_{7} / E_{8} / F_{4} / G_{2} | H_{n} |
| Regular polygon | Triangle | Square | p-gon | Hexagon | Pentagon |
| Uniform polyhedron | Tetrahedron | Octahedron • Cube | Demicube | | Dodecahedron • Icosahedron |
| Uniform polychoron | Pentachoron | 16-cell • Tesseract | Demitesseract | 24-cell | 120-cell • 600-cell |
| Uniform 5-polytope | 5-simplex | 5-orthoplex • 5-cube | 5-demicube | | |
| Uniform 6-polytope | 6-simplex | 6-orthoplex • 6-cube | 6-demicube | 1_{22} • 2_{21} | |
| Uniform 7-polytope | 7-simplex | 7-orthoplex • 7-cube | 7-demicube | 1_{32} • 2_{31} • 3_{21} | |
| Uniform 8-polytope | 8-simplex | 8-orthoplex • 8-cube | 8-demicube | 1_{42} • 2_{41} • 4_{21} | |
| Uniform 9-polytope | 9-simplex | 9-orthoplex • 9-cube | 9-demicube | | |
| Uniform 10-polytope | 10-simplex | 10-orthoplex • 10-cube | 10-demicube | | |
| Uniform n-polytope | n-simplex | n-orthoplex • n-cube | n-demicube | 1_{k2} • 2_{k1} • k_{21} | n-pentagonal polytope |
Topics: Polytope families • Regular polytope • List of regular polytopes and compounds • Polytope operations
