= Gosset–Elte figures =

Group of irregular uniform polytopes

The 4_{21} polytope of 8-space

In geometry, the Gosset–Elte figures, named by Coxeter after Thorold Gosset and E. L. Elte, are a group of uniform polytopes which are not regular, generated by a Wythoff construction with mirrors all related by order-2 and order-3 dihedral angles. They can be seen as one-end-ringed Coxeter–Dynkin diagrams.

The Coxeter symbol for these figures has the form k_{i,j}, where each letter represents a length of order-3 branches on a Coxeter–Dynkin diagram with a single ring on the end node of a k-length sequence of branches. The vertex figure of k_{i,j} is (k − 1)_{i,j}, and each of its facets are represented by subtracting one from one of the nonzero subscripts, i.e. k_{i − 1,j} and k_{i,j − 1}.

Rectified simplices are included in the list as limiting cases with k = 0. Similarly 0_{i,j,k} represents a bifurcated graph with a central node ringed.

== History ==
Coxeter named these figures as k_{i,j} (or k_{ij}) in shorthand and gave credit of their discovery to Gosset and Elte:

- Thorold Gosset first published a list of regular and semi-regular figures in space of n dimensions in 1900, enumerating polytopes with one or more types of regular polytope faces. This included the rectified 5-cell 0_{21} in 4-space, demipenteract 1_{21} in 5-space, 2_{21} in 6-space, 3_{21} in 7-space, 4_{21} in 8-space, and 5_{21} infinite tessellation in 8-space.
- E. L. Elte independently enumerated a different semiregular list in his 1912 book, The Semiregular Polytopes of the Hyperspaces. He called them semiregular polytopes of the first kind, limiting his search to one or two types of regular or semiregular k-faces.

Elte's enumeration included all the k_{ij} polytopes except for the 1_{42} which has 3 types of 6-faces.

The set of figures extend into honeycombs of (2,2,2), (3,3,1), and (5,2,1) families in 6,7,8 dimensional Euclidean spaces respectively. Gosset's list included the 5_{21} honeycomb as the only semiregular one in his definition.

== Definition ==
Simply-laced ADE groups

The polytopes and honeycombs in this family can be seen within ADE classification.

A finite polytope k_{ij} exists if

$$\frac{1}{i+1}+\frac{1}{j+1}+\frac{1}{k+1}>1$$

or equal for Euclidean honeycombs, and less for hyperbolic honeycombs.

The Coxeter group [3^{i,j,k}] can generate up to 3 unique uniform Gosset–Elte figures with Coxeter–Dynkin diagrams with one end node ringed. By Coxeter's notation, each figure is represented by k_{ij} to mean the end-node on the k-length sequence is ringed.

The simplex family can be seen as a limiting case with k = 0, and all rectified (single-ring) Coxeter–Dynkin diagrams.

== A-family [3^{n}] (rectified simplices) ==
The family of n-simplices contain Gosset–Elte figures of the form 0_{ij} as all rectified forms of the n-simplex (i + j = n − 1).

They are listed below, along with their Coxeter–Dynkin diagram, with each dimensional family drawn as a graphic orthogonal projection in the plane of the Petrie polygon of the regular simplex.

Coxeter group	Simplex	Rectified	Birectified	Trirectified	Quadrirectified
A_{1} [3^{0}]	= 0_{00}				
A_{2} [3^{1}]	= 0_{10}				
A_{3} [3^{2}]	= 0_{20}	= 0_{11}			
A_{4} [3^{3}]	= 0_{30}	= 0_{21}			
A_{5} [3^{4}]	= 0_{40}	= 0_{31}	= 0_{22}		
A_{6} [3^{5}]	= 0_{50}	= 0_{41}	= 0_{32}		
A_{7} [3^{6}]	= 0_{60}	= 0_{51}	= 0_{42}	= 0_{33}	
A_{8} [3^{7}]	= 0_{70}	= 0_{61}	= 0_{52}	= 0_{43}	
A_{9} [3^{8}]	= 0_{80}	= 0_{71}	= 0_{62}	= 0_{53}	= 0_{44}
A_{10} [3^{9}]	= 0_{90}	= 0_{81}	= 0_{72}	= 0_{63}	= 0_{54}
...	...				

== D-family [3^{n−3,1,1}] demihypercube ==
Each D_{n} group has two Gosset–Elte figures, the n-demihypercube as 1_{k1}, and an alternated form of the n-orthoplex, k_{11}, constructed with alternating simplex facets. Rectified n-demihypercubes, a lower symmetry form of a birectified n-cube, can also be represented as 0_{k11}.

Class	Demihypercubes	Orthoplexes (Regular)	Rectified demicubes
D_{3} [3^{1,1,0}]	= 1_{10}		= 0_{110}
D_{4} [3^{1,1,1}]	= 1_{11}		= 0_{111}
D_{5} [3^{2,1,1}]	= 1_{21}	= 2_{11}	= 0_{211}
D_{6} [3^{3,1,1}]	= 1_{31}	= 3_{11}	= 0_{311}
D_{7} [3^{4,1,1}]	= 1_{41}	= 4_{11}	= 0_{411}
D_{8} [3^{5,1,1}]	= 1_{51}	= 5_{11}	= 0_{511}
D_{9} [3^{6,1,1}]	= 1_{61}	= 6_{11}	= 0_{611}
D_{10} [3^{7,1,1}]	= 1_{71}	= 7_{11}	= 0_{711}
...	...	...	
D_{n} [3^{n−3,1,1}]	... = 1_{n−3,1}	... = (n−3)_{11}	... = 0_{n−3,1,1}

== E_{n} family [3^{n−4,2,1}] ==
Each E_{n} group from 4 to 8 has two or three Gosset–Elte figures, represented by one of the end-nodes ringed: k_{21}, 1_{k2}, 2_{k1}. A rectified 1_{k2} series can also be represented as 0_{k21}.

	2_{k1}	1_{k2}	k_{21}	0_{k21}
E_{4} [3^{0,2,1}]	= 2_{01}	= 1_{20}	= 0_{21}	
E_{5} [3^{1,2,1}]	= 2_{11}	= 1_{21}	= 1_{21}	= 0_{211}
E_{6} [3^{2,2,1}]	= 2_{21}	= 1_{22}	= 2_{21}	= 0_{221}
E_{7} [3^{3,2,1}]	= 2_{31}	= 1_{32}	= 3_{21}	= 0_{321}
E_{8} [3^{4,2,1}]	= 2_{41}	= 1_{42}	= 4_{21}	= 0_{421}

== Euclidean and hyperbolic honeycombs ==
There are three Euclidean (affine) Coxeter groups in dimensions 6, 7, and 8:

Coxeter group	Honeycombs			
${\tilde{E}}_6$ = [3^{2,2,2}]	= 2_{22}			= 0_{222}
${\tilde{E}}_7$ = [3^{3,3,1}]	= 3_{31}	= 1_{33}		= 0_{331}
${\tilde{E}}_8$ = [3^{5,2,1}]	= 2_{51}	= 1_{52}	= 5_{21}	= 0_{521}

There are three hyperbolic (paracompact) Coxeter groups in dimensions 7, 8, and 9:

Coxeter group	Honeycombs			
${\bar{T}}_7$ = [3^{3,2,2}]	= 3_{22}	= 2_{32}		= 0_{322}
${\bar{T}}_8$ = [3^{4,3,1}]	= 4_{31}	= 3_{41}	= 1_{43}	= 0_{431}
${\bar{T}}_9$ = [3^{6,2,1}]	= 2_{61}	= 1_{62}	= 6_{21}	= 0_{621}

As a generalization more order-3 branches can also be expressed in this symbol. The 4-dimensional affine Coxeter group, ${\tilde{Q}}_4$, [3^{1,1,1,1}], has four order-3 branches, and can express one honeycomb, 1_{111},, represents a lower symmetry form of the 16-cell honeycomb, and 0_{1111}, for the rectified 16-cell honeycomb. The 5-dimensional hyperbolic Coxeter group, ${\bar{L}}_4$, [3^{1,1,1,1,1}], has five order-3 branches, and can express one honeycomb, 1_{1111}, and its rectification as 0_{11111},.
