= Emanuel Lodewijk Elte =

Dutch mathematician (1881–1943)

Emanuel Lodewijk Elte (16 March 1881 in Amsterdam – 9 April 1943 in Sobibór) was a Dutch mathematician. He is noted for discovering and classifying semiregular polytopes in dimensions four and higher.

Elte's father Hartog Elte was headmaster of a school in Amsterdam. Emanuel Elte married Rebecca Stork in 1912 in Amsterdam, when he was a teacher at a high school in that city. By 1943 the family lived in Haarlem. When on January 30 of that year a German officer was shot in that town, in reprisal a hundred inhabitants of Haarlem were transported to the Camp Vught, including Elte and his family. As Jews, he and his wife were further deported to Sobibór, where they were murdered; his two children were murdered at Auschwitz.

== Elte's semiregular polytopes of the first kind ==
His work rediscovered the finite semiregular polytopes of Thorold Gosset, and further allowing not only regular facets, but recursively also allowing one or two semiregular ones. These were enumerated in his 1912 book, The Semiregular Polytopes of the Hyperspaces. He called them semiregular polytopes of the first kind, limiting his search to one or two types of regular or semiregular k-faces. These polytopes and more were rediscovered again by Coxeter, and renamed as a part of a larger class of uniform polytopes. In the process he discovered all the main representatives of the exceptional E_{n} family of polytopes, save only 1_{42} which did not satisfy his definition of semiregularity.

Summary of the semiregular polytopes of the first kind
n	Elte notation	Vertices	Edges	Faces	Cells	Facets	Schläfli symbol	Coxeter symbol	Coxeter diagram
Polyhedra (Archimedean solids)
3	tT	12	18	4p_{3}+4p_{6}			t{3,3}		
3	tC	24	36	6p_{8}+8p_{3}			t{4,3}		
3	tO	24	36	6p_{4}+8p_{6}			t{3,4}		
3	tD	60	90	20p_{3}+12p_{10}			t{5,3}		
3	tI	60	90	20p_{6}+12p_{5}			t{3,5}		
3	TT = O	6	12	(4+4)p_{3}			r{3,3} = {3^{1,1}}	0_{11}	
3	CO	12	24	6p_{4}+8p_{3}			r{3,4}		
3	ID	30	60	20p_{3}+12p_{5}			r{3,5}		
3	P_{q}	2q	4q	2p_{q}+qp_{4}			t{2,q}		
3	AP_{q}	2q	4q	2p_{q}+2qp_{3}			s{2,2q}		
semiregular 4-polytopes
4	tC_{5}	10	30	(10+20)p_{3}	5O+5T		r{3,3,3} = {3^{2,1}}	0_{21}	
4	tC_{8}	32	96	64p_{3}+24p_{4}	8CO+16T		r{4,3,3}		
4	tC_{16}=C_{24}(*)	48	96	96p_{3}	(16+8)O		r{3,3,4}		
4	tC_{24}	96	288	96p_{3} + 144p_{4}	24CO + 24C		r{3,4,3}		
4	tC_{600}	720	3600	(1200 + 2400)p_{3}	600O + 120I		r{3,3,5}		
4	tC_{120}	1200	3600	2400p_{3} + 720p_{5}	120ID+600T		r{5,3,3}		
4	HM_{4} = C_{16}(*)	8	24	32p_{3}	(8+8)T		{3,3^{1,1}}	1_{11}	
4	–	30	60	20p_{3} + 20p_{6}	(5 + 5)tT		2t{3,3,3}		
4	–	288	576	192p_{3} + 144p_{8}	(24 + 24)tC		2t{3,4,3}		
4	–	20	60	40p_{3} + 30p_{4}	10T + 20P_{3}		t_{0,3}{3,3,3}		
4	–	144	576	384p_{3} + 288p_{4}	48O + 192P_{3}		t_{0,3}{3,4,3}		
4	–	q^{2}	2q^{2}	q^{2}p_{4} + 2qp_{q}	(q + q)P_{q}		2t{q,2,q}		
semiregular 5-polytopes
5	S_{5}^{1}	15	60	(20+60)p_{3}	30T+15O	6C_{5}+6tC_{5}	r{3,3,3,3} = {3^{3,1}}	0_{31}	
5	S_{5}^{2}	20	90	120p_{3}	30T+30O	(6+6)C_{5}	2r{3,3,3,3} = {3^{2,2}}	0_{22}	
5	HM_{5}	16	80	160p_{3}	(80+40)T	16C_{5}+10C_{16}	{3,3^{2,1}}	1_{21}	
5	Cr_{5}^{1}	40	240	(80+320)p_{3}	160T+80O	32tC_{5}+10C_{16}	r{3,3,3,4}		
5	Cr_{5}^{2}	80	480	(320+320)p_{3}	80T+200O	32tC_{5}+10C_{24}	2r{3,3,3,4}		
semiregular 6-polytopes
6	S_{6}^{1} (*)						r{3^{5}} = {3^{4,1}}	0_{41}	
6	S_{6}^{2} (*)						2r{3^{5}} = {3^{3,2}}	0_{32}	
6	HM_{6}	32	240	640p_{3}	(160+480)T	32S_{5}+12HM_{5}	{3,3^{3,1}}	1_{31}	
6	V_{27}	27	216	720p_{3}	1080T	72S_{5}+27HM_{5}	{3,3,3^{2,1}}	2_{21}	
6	V_{72}	72	720	2160p_{3}	2160T	(27+27)HM_{6}	{3,3^{2,2}}	1_{22}	
semiregular 7-polytopes
7	S_{7}^{1} (*)						r{3^{6}} = {3^{5,1}}	0_{51}	
7	S_{7}^{2} (*)						2r{3^{6}} = {3^{4,2}}	0_{42}	
7	S_{7}^{3} (*)						3r{3^{6}} = {3^{3,3}}	0_{33}	
7	HM_{7}(*)	64	672	2240p_{3}	(560+2240)T	64S_{6}+14HM_{6}	{3,3^{4,1}}	1_{41}	
7	V_{56}	56	756	4032p_{3}	10080T	576S_{6}+126Cr_{6}	{3,3,3,3^{2,1}}	3_{21}	
7	V_{126}	126	2016	10080p_{3}	20160T	576S_{6}+56V_{27}	{3,3,3^{3,1}}	2_{31}	
7	V_{576}	576	10080	40320p_{3}	(30240+20160)T	126HM_{6}+56V_{72}	{3,3^{3,2}}	1_{32}	
semiregular 8-polytopes
8	S_{8}^{1} (*)						r{3^{7}} = {3^{6,1}}	0_{61}	
8	S_{8}^{2} (*)						2r{3^{7}} = {3^{5,2}}	0_{52}	
8	S_{8}^{3} (*)						3r{3^{7}} = {3^{4,3}}	0_{43}	
8	HM_{8}(*)	128	1792	7168p_{3}	(1792+8960)T	128S_{7}+16HM_{7}	{3,3^{5,1}}	1_{51}	
8	V_{2160}	2160	69120	483840p_{3}	1209600T	17280S_{7}+240V_{126}	{3,3,3^{4,1}}	2_{41}	
8	V_{240}	240	6720	60480p_{3}	241920T	17280S_{7}+2160Cr_{7}	{3,3,3,3,3^{2,1}}	4_{21}	

(*) Added in this table as a sequence Elte recognized but did not enumerate explicitly

Regular dimensional families:

- S_{n} = n-simplex: S_{3}, S_{4}, S_{5}, S_{6}, S_{7}, S_{8}, ...
- M_{n} = n-cube= measure polytope: M_{3}, M_{4}, M_{5}, M_{6}, M_{7}, M_{8}, ...
- HM_{n} = n-demicube= half-measure polytope: HM_{3}, HM_{4}, M_{5}, M_{6}, HM_{7}, HM_{8}, ...
- Cr_{n} = n-orthoplex= cross polytope: Cr_{3}, Cr_{4}, Cr_{5}, Cr_{6}, Cr_{7}, Cr_{8}, ...

Semiregular polytopes of first order:

- V_{n} = semiregular polytope with n vertices

Polygons

- P_{n} = regular n-gon

Polyhedra:

- Regular: T, C, O, I, D
- Truncated: tT, tC, tO, tI, tD
- Quasiregular (rectified): CO, ID
- Cantellated: RCO, RID
- Truncated quasiregular (omnitruncated): tCO, tID
- Prismatic: P_{n}, AP_{n}

4-polytopes:

- C_{n} = Regular 4-polytopes with n cells: C_{5}, C_{8}, C_{16}, C_{24}, C_{120}, C_{600}
- Rectified: tC_{5}, tC_{8}, tC_{16}, tC_{24}, tC_{120}, tC_{600}

== See also ==
- Gosset–Elte figures
