= A6 polytope =

Orthographic projections A_{6} Coxeter plane
6-simplex

In 6-dimensional geometry, there are 35 uniform polytopes with A_{6} symmetry. There is one self-dual regular form, the 6-simplex with 7 vertices.

Each can be visualized as symmetric orthographic projections in Coxeter planes of the A_{6} Coxeter group, and other subgroups.

== Graphs ==
Symmetric orthographic projections of these 35 polytopes can be made in the A_{6}, A_{5}, A_{4}, A_{3}, A_{2} Coxeter planes. A_{k} graphs have [k+1] symmetry. For even k and symmetric ringed diagrams, symmetry doubles to [2(k+1)].

These 35 polytopes are each shown in these 5 symmetry planes, with vertices and edges drawn, and vertices colored by the number of overlapping vertices in each projective position.

#	A_{6} [7]	A_{5} [6]	A_{4} [5]	A_{3} [4]	A_{2} [3]	Coxeter-Dynkin diagram Schläfli symbol Name
1						t_{0}{3,3,3,3,3} 6-simplex Heptapeton (hop)
2						t_{1}{3,3,3,3,3} Rectified 6-simplex Rectified heptapeton (ril)
3						t_{0,1}{3,3,3,3,3} Truncated 6-simplex Truncated heptapeton (til)
4						t_{2}{3,3,3,3,3} Birectified 6-simplex Birectified heptapeton (bril)
5						t_{0,2}{3,3,3,3,3} Cantellated 6-simplex Small rhombated heptapeton (sril)
6						t_{1,2}{3,3,3,3,3} Bitruncated 6-simplex Bitruncated heptapeton (batal)
7						t_{0,1,2}{3,3,3,3,3} Cantitruncated 6-simplex Great rhombated heptapeton (gril)
8						t_{0,3}{3,3,3,3,3} Runcinated 6-simplex Small prismated heptapeton (spil)
9						t_{1,3}{3,3,3,3,3} Bicantellated 6-simplex Small birhombated heptapeton (sabril)
10						t_{0,1,3}{3,3,3,3,3} Runcitruncated 6-simplex Prismatotruncated heptapeton (patal)
11						t_{2,3}{3,3,3,3,3} Tritruncated 6-simplex Tetradecapeton (fe)
12						t_{0,2,3}{3,3,3,3,3} Runcicantellated 6-simplex Prismatorhombated heptapeton (pril)
13						t_{1,2,3}{3,3,3,3,3} Bicantitruncated 6-simplex Great birhombated heptapeton (gabril)
14						t_{0,1,2,3}{3,3,3,3,3} Runcicantitruncated 6-simplex Great prismated heptapeton (gapil)
15						t_{0,4}{3,3,3,3,3} Stericated 6-simplex Small cellated heptapeton (scal)
16						t_{1,4}{3,3,3,3,3} Biruncinated 6-simplex Small biprismato-tetradecapeton (sibpof)
17						t_{0,1,4}{3,3,3,3,3} Steritruncated 6-simplex cellitruncated heptapeton (catal)
18						t_{0,2,4}{3,3,3,3,3} Stericantellated 6-simplex Cellirhombated heptapeton (cral)
19						t_{1,2,4}{3,3,3,3,3} Biruncitruncated 6-simplex Biprismatorhombated heptapeton (bapril)
20						t_{0,1,2,4}{3,3,3,3,3} Stericantitruncated 6-simplex Celligreatorhombated heptapeton (cagral)
21						t_{0,3,4}{3,3,3,3,3} Steriruncinated 6-simplex Celliprismated heptapeton (copal)
22						t_{0,1,3,4}{3,3,3,3,3} Steriruncitruncated 6-simplex celliprismatotruncated heptapeton (captal)
23						t_{0,2,3,4}{3,3,3,3,3} Steriruncicantellated 6-simplex celliprismatorhombated heptapeton (copril)
24						t_{1,2,3,4}{3,3,3,3,3} Biruncicantitruncated 6-simplex Great biprismato-tetradecapeton (gibpof)
25						t_{0,1,2,3,4}{3,3,3,3,3} Steriruncicantitruncated 6-simplex Great cellated heptapeton (gacal)
26						t_{0,5}{3,3,3,3,3} Pentellated 6-simplex Small teri-tetradecapeton (staf)
27						t_{0,1,5}{3,3,3,3,3} Pentitruncated 6-simplex Tericellated heptapeton (tocal)
28						t_{0,2,5}{3,3,3,3,3} Penticantellated 6-simplex Teriprismated heptapeton (tapal)
29						t_{0,1,2,5}{3,3,3,3,3} Penticantitruncated 6-simplex Terigreatorhombated heptapeton (togral)
30						t_{0,1,3,5}{3,3,3,3,3} Pentiruncitruncated 6-simplex Tericellirhombated heptapeton (tocral)
31						t_{0,2,3,5}{3,3,3,3,3} Pentiruncicantellated 6-simplex Teriprismatorhombi-tetradecapeton (taporf)
32						t_{0,1,2,3,5}{3,3,3,3,3} Pentiruncicantitruncated 6-simplex Terigreatoprismated heptapeton (tagopal)
33						t_{0,1,4,5}{3,3,3,3,3} Pentisteritruncated 6-simplex tericellitrunki-tetradecapeton (tactaf)
34						t_{0,1,2,4,5}{3,3,3,3,3} Pentistericantitruncated 6-simplex tericelligreatorhombated heptapeton (tacogral)
35						t_{0,1,2,3,4,5}{3,3,3,3,3} Omnitruncated 6-simplex Great teri-tetradecapeton (gotaf)

Fundamental convex regular and uniform polytopes in dimensions 2–10
Family	A_{n}	B_{n}	I_{2}(p) / D_{n}	E_{6} / E_{7} / E_{8} / F_{4} / G_{2}	H_{n}
Regular polygon	Triangle	Square	p-gon	Hexagon	Pentagon
Uniform polyhedron	Tetrahedron	Octahedron • Cube	Demicube		Dodecahedron • Icosahedron
Uniform polychoron	Pentachoron	16-cell • Tesseract	Demitesseract	24-cell	120-cell • 600-cell
Uniform 5-polytope	5-simplex	5-orthoplex • 5-cube	5-demicube		
Uniform 6-polytope	6-simplex	6-orthoplex • 6-cube	6-demicube	1_{22} • 2_{21}	
Uniform 7-polytope	7-simplex	7-orthoplex • 7-cube	7-demicube	1_{32} • 2_{31} • 3_{21}	
Uniform 8-polytope	8-simplex	8-orthoplex • 8-cube	8-demicube	1_{42} • 2_{41} • 4_{21}	
Uniform 9-polytope	9-simplex	9-orthoplex • 9-cube	9-demicube		
Uniform 10-polytope	10-simplex	10-orthoplex • 10-cube	10-demicube		
Uniform n-polytope	n-simplex	n-orthoplex • n-cube	n-demicube	1_{k2} • 2_{k1} • k_{21}	n-pentagonal polytope
Topics: Polytope families • Regular polytope • List of regular polytopes and compounds • Polytope operations
