= Cantellated 120-cell =

4D geometry item

Four cantellations
120-cell	Cantellated 120-cell	Cantellated 600-cell
600-cell	Cantitruncated 120-cell	Cantitruncated 600-cell
Orthogonal projections in H_{3} Coxeter plane

In four-dimensional geometry, a cantellated 120-cell is a convex uniform 4-polytope, being a cantellation (a 2nd order truncation) of the regular 120-cell.

There are four degrees of cantellations of the 120-cell including with permutations truncations. Two are expressed relative to the dual 600-cell.

== Cantellated 120-cell ==
Cantellated 120-cell
Type	Uniform 4-polytope
Uniform index	37
Coxeter diagram	
Cells	1920 total: 120 (3.4.5.4); 1200 (3.4.4); 600 (3.3.3.3)
Faces	4800{3}+3600{4}+720{5}
Edges	10800
Vertices	3600
Vertex figure	wedge
Schläfli symbol	t_{0,2}{5,3,3}
Symmetry group	H_{4}, [3,3,5], order 14400
Properties	convex

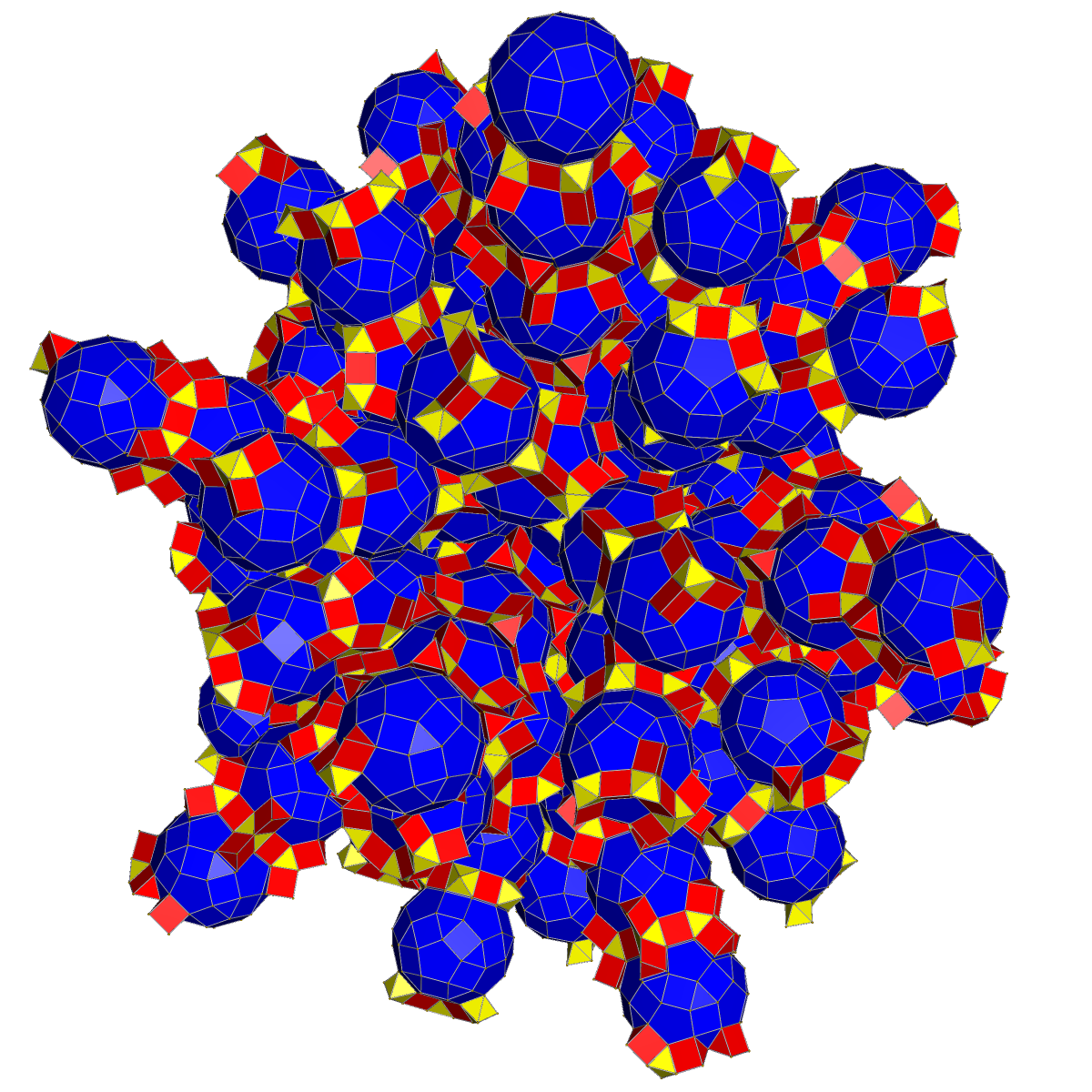
Net

The cantellated 120-cell is a uniform 4-polytope. It is named by its construction as a Cantellation operation applied to the regular 120-cell. It contains 1920 cells, including 120 rhombicosidodecahedra, 1200 triangular prisms, 600 octahedra. Its vertex figure is a wedge, with two rhombicosidodecahedra, two triangular prisms, and one octahedron meeting at each vertex.

=== Alternative names ===
- Cantellated 120-cell Norman Johnson
- Cantellated hecatonicosachoron / Cantellated dodecacontachoron / Cantellated polydodecahedron
- Small rhombated hecatonicosachoron (Acronym srahi) (George Olshevsky and Jonathan Bowers)
- Ambo-02 polydodecahedron (John Conway)

=== Images ===
Orthographic projections by Coxeter planes
H_{3}	A_{2} / B_{3} / D_{4}	A_{3} / B_{2}
[10]	[6]	[4]

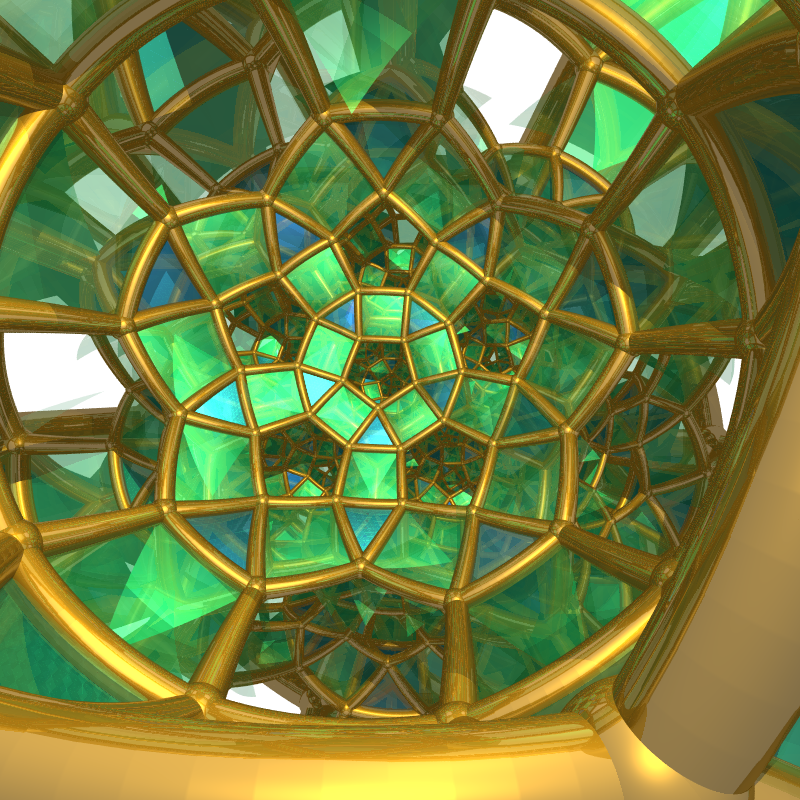
Schlegel diagram. Pentagonal face are removed.

== Cantitruncated 120-cell ==
Cantitruncated 120-cell
Type	Uniform 4-polytope
Uniform index	42
Schläfli symbol	t_{0,1,2}{5,3,3}
Coxeter diagram	
Cells	1920 total: 120 (4.6.10); 1200 (3.4.4); 600 (3.6.6)
Faces	9120: 2400{3}+3600{4}+ 2400{6}+720{10}
Edges	14400
Vertices	7200
Vertex figure	sphenoid
Symmetry group	H_{4}, [3,3,5], order 14400
Properties	convex

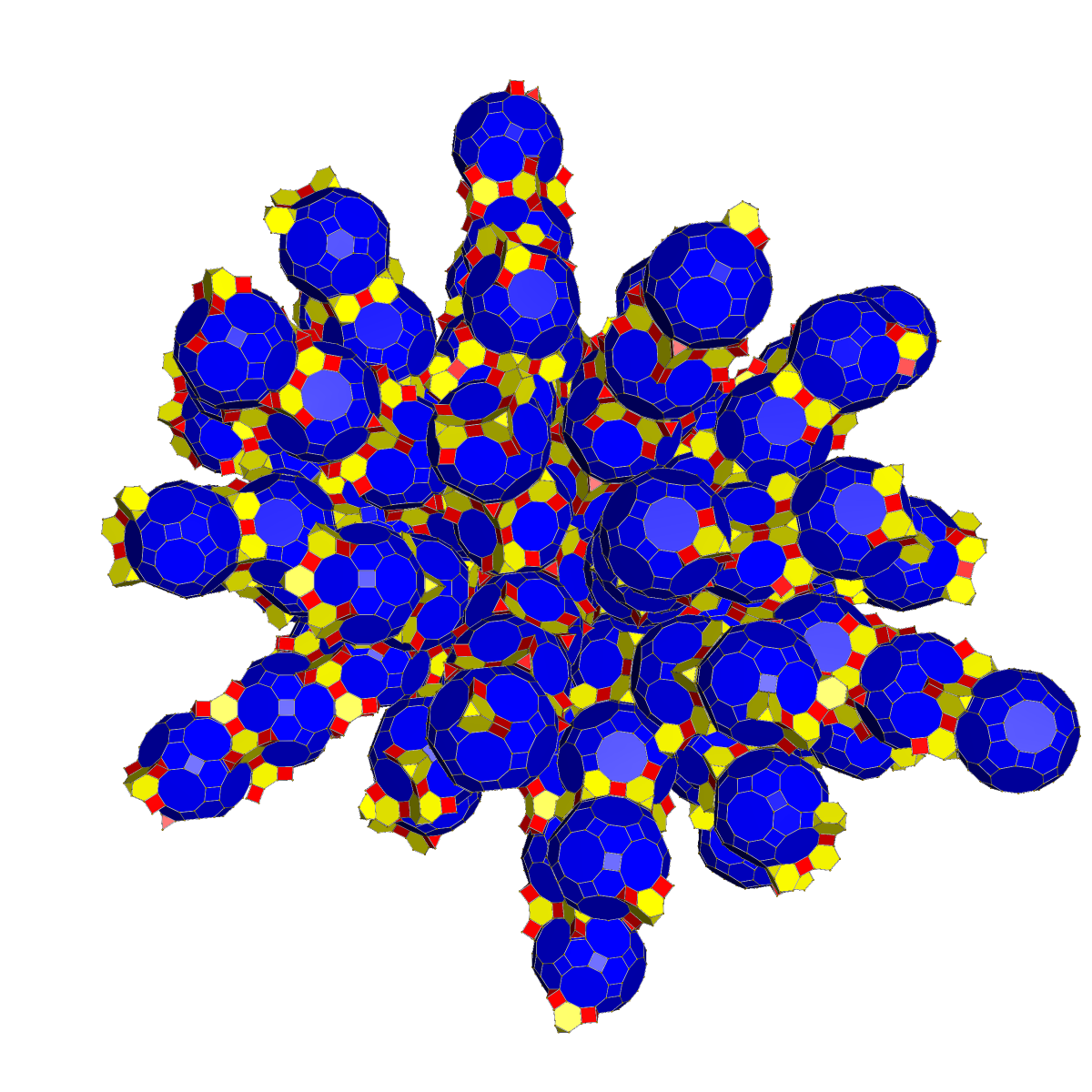
Net

The cantitruncated 120-cell is a uniform polychoron.

This 4-polytope is related to the regular 120-cell. The cantitruncation operation create new truncated tetrahedral cells at the vertices, and triangular prisms at the edges. The original dodecahedron cells are cantitruncated into great rhombicosidodecahedron cells.

The image shows the 4-polytope drawn as a Schlegel diagram which projects the 4-dimensional figure into 3-space, distorting the sizes of the cells. In addition, the decagonal faces are hidden, allowing us to see the elemented projected inside.

=== Alternative names ===
- Cantitruncated 120-cell Norman Johnson
- Cantitruncated hecatonicosachoron / Cantitruncated polydodecahedron
- Great rhombated hecatonicosachoron (Acronym grahi) (George Olshevsky and Jonthan Bowers)
- Ambo-012 polydodecahedron (John Conway)

=== Images ===
Orthographic projections by Coxeter planes
H_{3}	A_{2} / B_{3} / D_{4}	A_{3} / B_{2}
[10]	[6]	[4]

Schlegel diagram
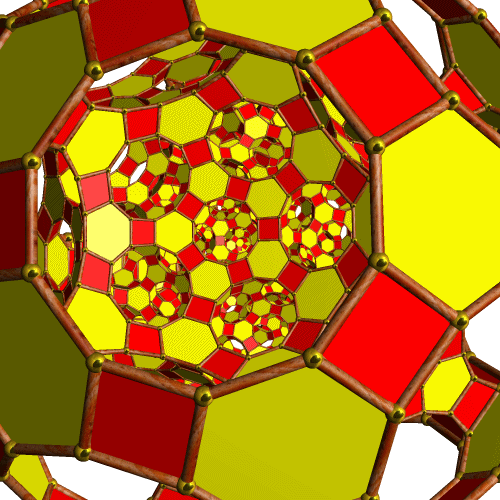
Centered on truncated icosidodecahedron cell with decagonal faces hidden.

== Cantellated 600-cell ==
Cantellated 600-cell
Type	Uniform 4-polytope
Uniform index	40
Schläfli symbol	t_{0,2}{3,3,5}
Coxeter diagram	
Cells	1440 total: 120 3.5.3.5; 600 3.4.3.4; 720 4.4.5
Faces	8640 total: (1200+2400){3} +3600{4}+1440{5}
Edges	10800
Vertices	3600
Vertex figure	isosceles triangular prism
Symmetry group	H_{4}, [3,3,5], order 14400
Properties	convex

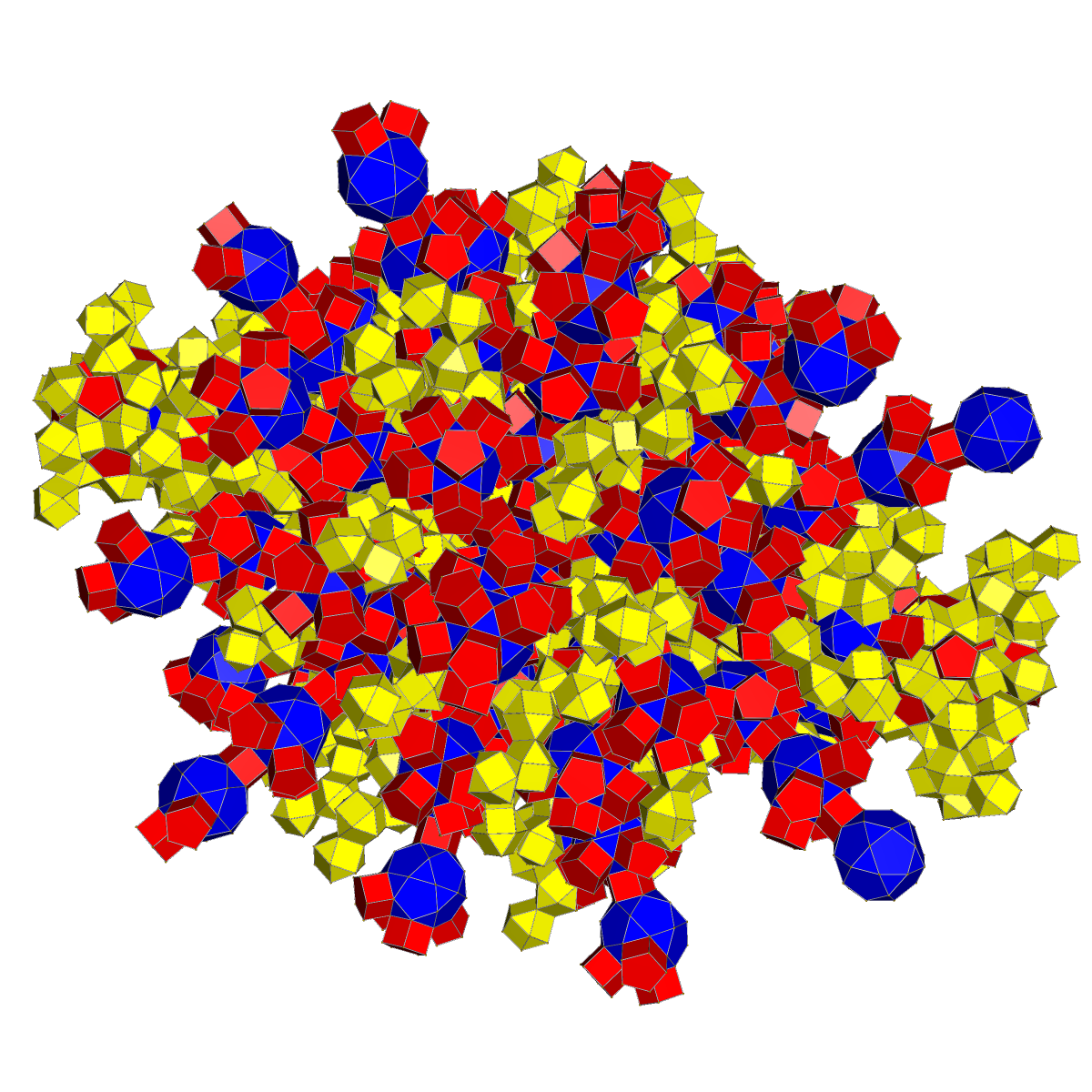
Net

The cantellated 600-cell is a uniform 4-polytope. It has 1440 cells: 120 icosidodecahedra, 600 cuboctahedra, and 720 pentagonal prisms. Its vertex figure is an isosceles triangular prism, defined by one icosidodecahedron, two cuboctahedra, and two pentagonal prisms.

=== Alternative names ===
- Cantellated 600-cell Norman Johnson
- Cantellated hexacosichoron / Cantellated tetraplex
- Small rhombihexacosichoron (Acronym srix) (George Olshevsky and Jonathan Bowers)
- Ambo-02 tetraplex (John Conway)

=== Construction ===
This 4-polytope has cells at 3 of 4 positions in the fundamental domain, extracted from the Coxeter diagram by removing one node at a time:

Node	Order	Coxeter diagram	Cell	Picture
0	600		Cantellated tetrahedron (Cuboctahedron)	
1	1200		None (Degenerate triangular prism)	
2	720		Pentagonal prism	
3	120		Rectified dodecahedron (Icosidodecahedron)	

There are 1440 pentagonal faces between the icosidodecahedra and pentagonal prisms. There are 3600 squares between the cuboctahedra and pentagonal prisms. There are 2400 triangular faces between the icosidodecahedra and cuboctahedra, and 1200 triangular faces between pairs of cuboctahedra.

There are two classes of edges: 3-4-4, 3-4-5: 3600 have two squares and a triangle around it, and 7200 have one triangle, one square, and one pentagon.

=== Images ===
Orthographic projections by Coxeter planes
H_{4}	-
[30]	[20]
F_{4}	H_{3}
[12]	[10]
A_{2} / B_{3} / D_{4}	A_{3} / B_{2}
[6]	[4]

Schlegel diagram
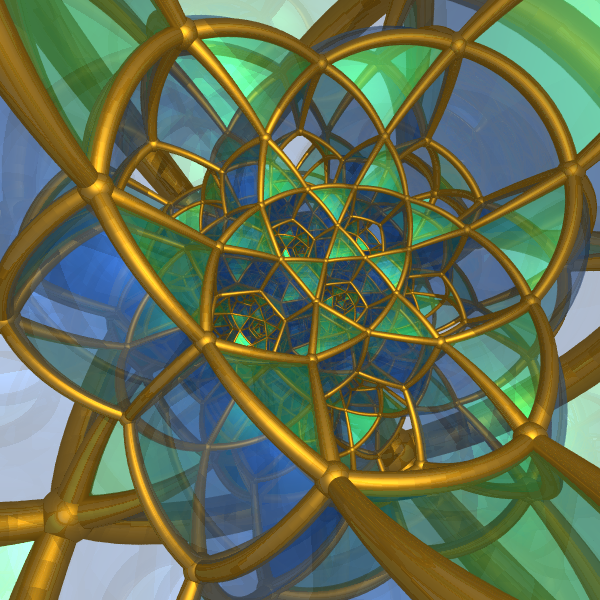
Stereographic projection with its 3600 green triangular faces and its 3600 blue square faces

== Cantitruncated 600-cell ==
Cantitruncated 600-cell
Type	Uniform 4-polytope
Uniform index	45
Coxeter diagram	
Cells	1440 total: 120 (5.6.6); 720 (4.4.5); 600 (4.6.6)
Faces	8640: 3600{4}+1440{5}+ 3600{6}
Edges	14400
Vertices	7200
Vertex figure	sphenoid
Schläfli symbol	t_{0,1,2}{3,3,5}
Symmetry group	H_{4}, [3,3,5], order 14400
Properties	convex

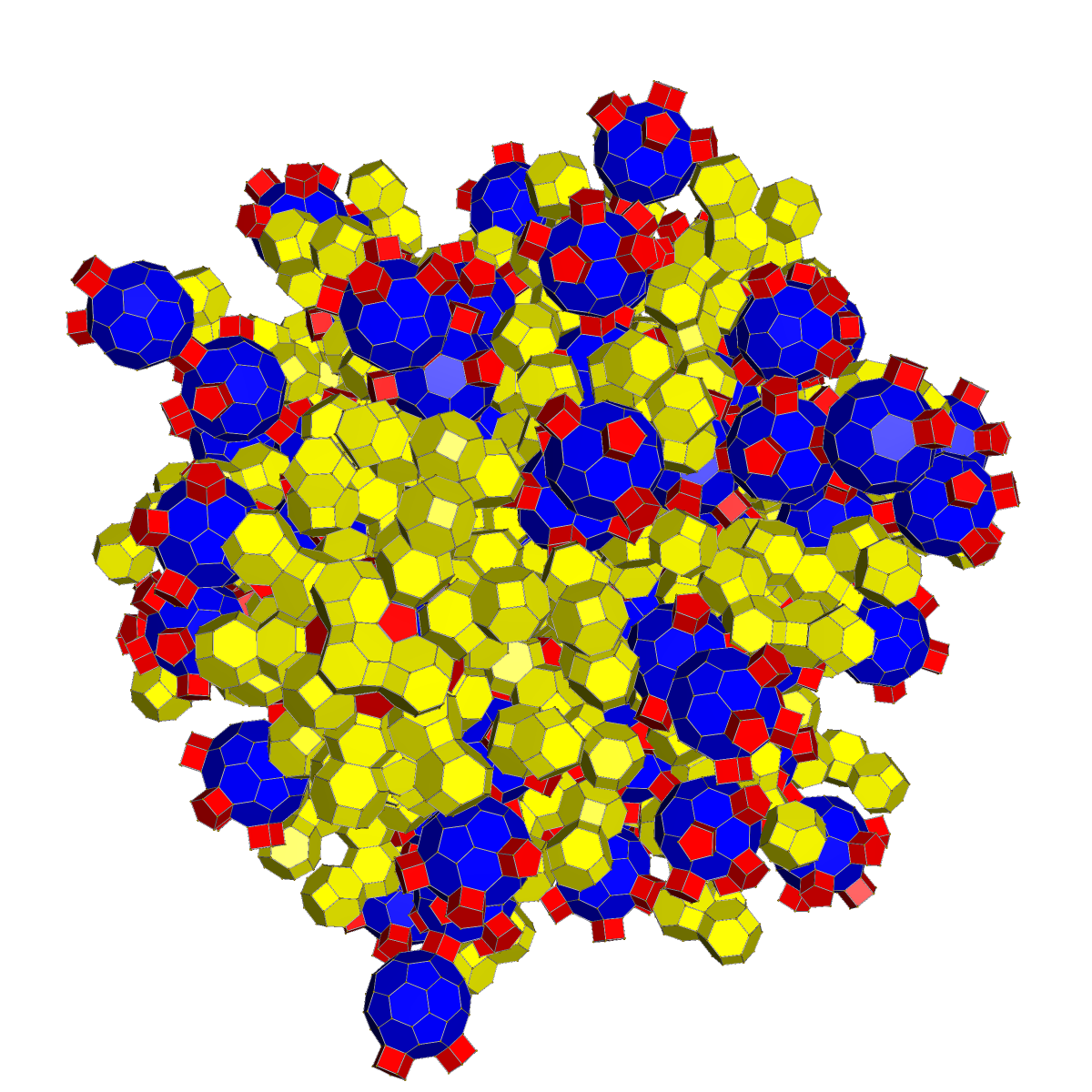
Net

The cantitruncated 600-cell is a uniform 4-polytope. It is composed of 1440 cells: 120 truncated icosahedra, 720 pentagonal prisms and 600 truncated octahedra. It has 7200 vertices, 14400 edges, and 8640 faces (3600 squares, 1440 pentagons, and 3600 hexagons). It has an irregular tetrahedral vertex figure, filled by one truncated icosahedron, one pentagonal prism and two truncated octahedra.

=== Alternative names ===
- Cantitruncated 600-cell (Norman Johnson)
- Cantitruncated hexacosichoron / Cantitruncated polydodecahedron
- Great rhombated hexacosichoron (acronym grix) (George Olshevsky and Jonathan Bowers)
- Ambo-012 polytetrahedron (John Conway)

=== Images ===
Schlegel diagram
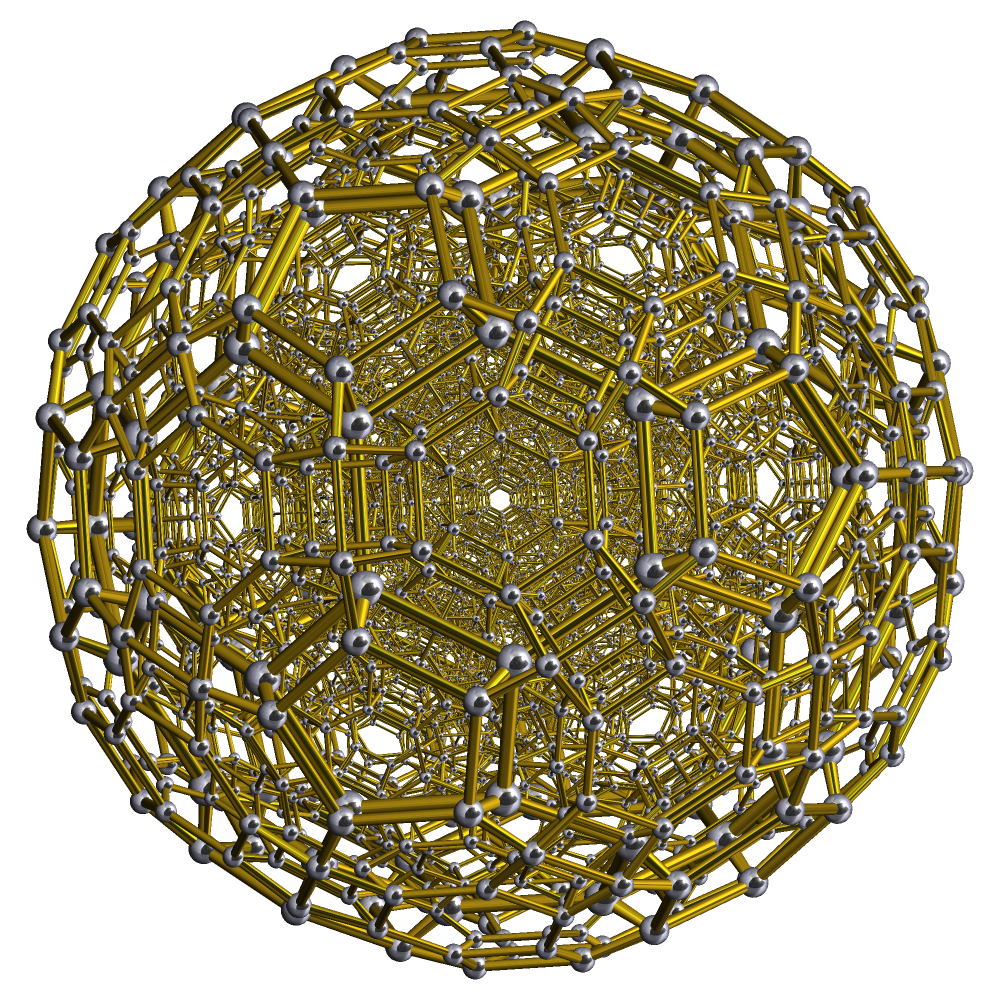

Orthographic projections by Coxeter planes
H_{3}	A_{2} / B_{3} / D_{4}	A_{3} / B_{2}
[10]	[6]	[4]

== Related polytopes ==
H_{4} family polytopes
120-cell	rectified 120-cell	truncated 120-cell	cantellated 120-cell	runcinated 120-cell	cantitruncated 120-cell	runcitruncated 120-cell	omnitruncated 120-cell
{5,3,3}	r{5,3,3}	t{5,3,3}	rr{5,3,3}	t_{0,3}{5,3,3}	tr{5,3,3}	t_{0,1,3}{5,3,3}	t_{0,1,2,3}{5,3,3}
600-cell	rectified 600-cell	truncated 600-cell	cantellated 600-cell	bitruncated 600-cell	cantitruncated 600-cell	runcitruncated 600-cell	omnitruncated 600-cell
{3,3,5}	r{3,3,5}	t{3,3,5}	rr{3,3,5}	2t{3,3,5}	tr{3,3,5}	t_{0,1,3}{3,3,5}	t_{0,1,2,3}{3,3,5}

== Notes ==
Fundamental convex regular and uniform polytopes in dimensions 2–10
Family	A_{n}	B_{n}	I_{2}(p) / D_{n}	E_{6} / E_{7} / E_{8} / F_{4} / G_{2}	H_{n}
Regular polygon	Triangle	Square	p-gon	Hexagon	Pentagon
Uniform polyhedron	Tetrahedron	Octahedron • Cube	Demicube		Dodecahedron • Icosahedron
Uniform polychoron	Pentachoron	16-cell • Tesseract	Demitesseract	24-cell	120-cell • 600-cell
Uniform 5-polytope	5-simplex	5-orthoplex • 5-cube	5-demicube		
Uniform 6-polytope	6-simplex	6-orthoplex • 6-cube	6-demicube	1_{22} • 2_{21}	
Uniform 7-polytope	7-simplex	7-orthoplex • 7-cube	7-demicube	1_{32} • 2_{31} • 3_{21}	
Uniform 8-polytope	8-simplex	8-orthoplex • 8-cube	8-demicube	1_{42} • 2_{41} • 4_{21}	
Uniform 9-polytope	9-simplex	9-orthoplex • 9-cube	9-demicube		
Uniform 10-polytope	10-simplex	10-orthoplex • 10-cube	10-demicube		
Uniform n-polytope	n-simplex	n-orthoplex • n-cube	n-demicube	1_{k2} • 2_{k1} • k_{21}	n-pentagonal polytope
Topics: Polytope families • Regular polytope • List of regular polytopes and compounds • Polytope operations
