= Rectified 600-cell =

Rectified 600-cell
Schlegel diagram, shown as Birectified 120-cell, with 119 icosahedral cells colored
Type	Uniform 4-polytope
Uniform index	34
Schläfli symbol	t_{1}{3,3,5} or r{3,3,5}
Coxeter-Dynkin diagram	
Cells	600 (3.3.3.3); 120 {3,5}
Faces	1200+2400 {3}
Edges	3600
Vertices	720
Vertex figure	pentagonal prism
Symmetry group	H_{4}, [3,3,5], order 14400
Properties	convex, vertex-transitive, edge-transitive

In geometry, the rectified 600-cell or rectified hexacosichoron is a convex uniform 4-polytope composed of 600 regular octahedra and 120 icosahedra cells. Each edge has two octahedra and one icosahedron. Each vertex has five octahedra and two icosahedra. In total it has 3600 triangle faces, 3600 edges, and 720 vertices.

Containing the cell realms of both the regular 120-cell and the regular 600-cell, it can be considered analogous to the polyhedron icosidodecahedron, which is a rectified icosahedron and rectified dodecahedron.

The vertex figure of the rectified 600-cell is a uniform pentagonal prism.

== Semiregular polytope ==
It is one of three semiregular 4-polytopes made of two or more cells which are Platonic solids, discovered by Thorold Gosset in his 1900 paper. He called it a octicosahedric for being made of octahedron and icosahedron cells.

E. L. Elte identified it in 1912 as a semiregular polytope, labeling it as tC_{600}.

== Alternate names ==
- octicosahedric (Thorold Gosset)
- Icosahedral hexacosihecatonicosachoron
- Rectified 600-cell (Norman W. Johnson)
- Rectified hexacosichoron
- Rectified polytetrahedron
- Rox (Jonathan Bowers)

== Images ==
Orthographic projections by Coxeter planes
H_{4}	-	F_{4}
[30]	[20]	[12]
H_{3}	A_{2} / B_{3} / D_{4}	A_{3} / B_{2}
[10]	[6]	[4]

Stereographic projection	Net

== Related polytopes ==
=== Diminished rectified 600-cell ===
120-diminished rectified 600-cell
Type	4-polytope
Cells	840 cells: 600 square pyramid 120 pentagonal prism 120 pentagonal antiprism
Faces	2640: 1800 {3} 600 {4} 240 {5}
Edges	2400
Vertices	600
Vertex figure	Bi-diminished pentagonal prism (1) 3.3.3.3 + (4) 3.3.4 (2) 4.4.5 (2) 3.3.3.5
Symmetry group	1/12[3,3,5], order 1200
Properties	convex

A related vertex-transitive polytope can be constructed with equal edge lengths removes 120 vertices from the rectified 600-cell, but isn't uniform because it contains square pyramid cells, discovered by George Olshevsky, calling it a swirlprismatodiminished rectified hexacosichoron, with 840 cells (600 square pyramids, 120 pentagonal prisms, and 120 pentagonal antiprisms), 2640 faces (1800 triangles, 600 square, and 240 pentagons), 2400 edges, and 600 vertices. It has a chiral bi-diminished pentagonal prism vertex figure.

Each removed vertex creates a pentagonal prism cell, and diminishes two neighboring icosahedra into pentagonal antiprisms, and each octahedron into a square pyramid.

This polytope can be partitioned into 12 rings of alternating 10 pentagonal prisms and 10 antiprisms, and 30 rings of square pyramids.

Schlegel diagram	Orthogonal projection
Two orthogonal rings shown	2 rings of 30 red square pyramids, one ring along perimeter, and one centered.

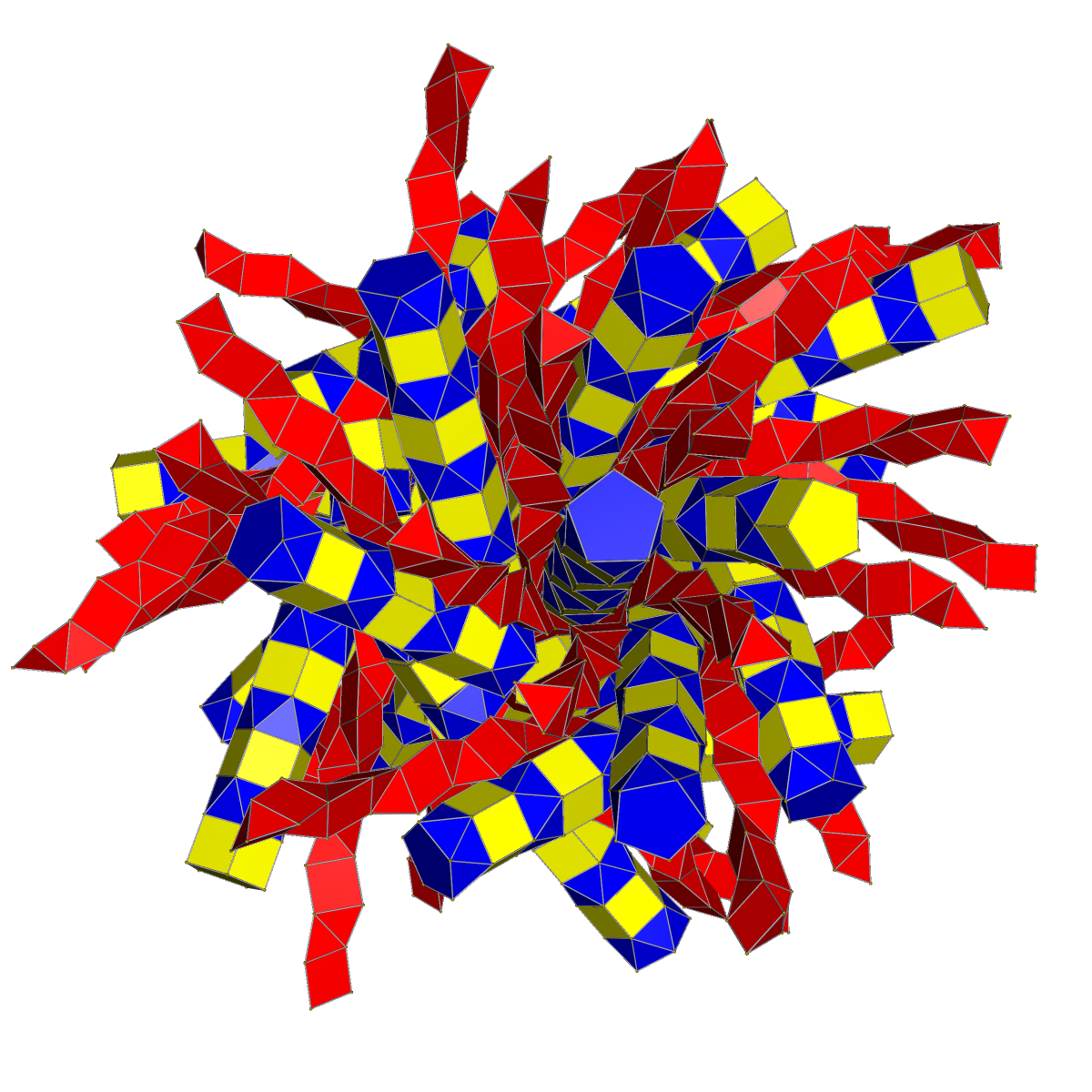
Net

=== H4 family ===
H_{4} family polytopes
120-cell	rectified 120-cell	truncated 120-cell	cantellated 120-cell	runcinated 120-cell	cantitruncated 120-cell	runcitruncated 120-cell	omnitruncated 120-cell
{5,3,3}	r{5,3,3}	t{5,3,3}	rr{5,3,3}	t_{0,3}{5,3,3}	tr{5,3,3}	t_{0,1,3}{5,3,3}	t_{0,1,2,3}{5,3,3}
600-cell	rectified 600-cell	truncated 600-cell	cantellated 600-cell	bitruncated 600-cell	cantitruncated 600-cell	runcitruncated 600-cell	omnitruncated 600-cell
{3,3,5}	r{3,3,5}	t{3,3,5}	rr{3,3,5}	2t{3,3,5}	tr{3,3,5}	t_{0,1,3}{3,3,5}	t_{0,1,2,3}{3,3,5}

=== Pentagonal prism vertex figures ===
r{p,3,5}
Space	S^{3}	H^{3}				
Form	Finite	Compact		Paracompact	Noncompact	
Name	r{3,3,5}	r{4,3,5}	r{5,3,5}	r{6,3,5}	r{7,3,5}	... r{∞,3,5}
Image						
Cells {3,5}	r{3,3}	r{4,3}	r{5,3}	r{6,3}	r{7,3}	r{∞,3}

Fundamental convex regular and uniform polytopes in dimensions 2–10
Family	A_{n}	B_{n}	I_{2}(p) / D_{n}	E_{6} / E_{7} / E_{8} / F_{4} / G_{2}	H_{n}
Regular polygon	Triangle	Square	p-gon	Hexagon	Pentagon
Uniform polyhedron	Tetrahedron	Octahedron • Cube	Demicube		Dodecahedron • Icosahedron
Uniform polychoron	Pentachoron	16-cell • Tesseract	Demitesseract	24-cell	120-cell • 600-cell
Uniform 5-polytope	5-simplex	5-orthoplex • 5-cube	5-demicube		
Uniform 6-polytope	6-simplex	6-orthoplex • 6-cube	6-demicube	1_{22} • 2_{21}	
Uniform 7-polytope	7-simplex	7-orthoplex • 7-cube	7-demicube	1_{32} • 2_{31} • 3_{21}	
Uniform 8-polytope	8-simplex	8-orthoplex • 8-cube	8-demicube	1_{42} • 2_{41} • 4_{21}	
Uniform 9-polytope	9-simplex	9-orthoplex • 9-cube	9-demicube		
Uniform 10-polytope	10-simplex	10-orthoplex • 10-cube	10-demicube		
Uniform n-polytope	n-simplex	n-orthoplex • n-cube	n-demicube	1_{k2} • 2_{k1} • k_{21}	n-pentagonal polytope
Topics: Polytope families • Regular polytope • List of regular polytopes and compounds • Polytope operations
