= Rectified 120-cell =

Four rectifications
120-cell	Rectified 120-cell
600-cell	Rectified 600-cell
Orthogonal projections in H_{3} Coxeter plane

In geometry, a rectified 120-cell is a uniform 4-polytope formed as the rectification of the regular 120-cell.

E. L. Elte identified it in 1912 as a semiregular polytope, labeling it as tC_{120}.

There are four rectifications of the 120-cell, including the zeroth, the 120-cell itself. The birectified 120-cell is more easily seen as a rectified 600-cell, and the trirectified 120-cell is the same as the dual 600-cell.

== Rectified 120-cell ==
Rectified 120-cell
Schlegel diagram, centered on icosidodecahedon, tetrahedral cells visible
Type	Uniform 4-polytope
Uniform index	33
Coxeter diagram	
Schläfli symbol	t_{1}{5,3,3} or r{5,3,3}
Cells	720 total: 120 (3.5.3.5); 600 (3.3.3)
Faces	3120 total: 2400 {3}, 720 {5}
Edges	3600
Vertices	1200
Vertex figure	triangular prism
Symmetry group	H_{4} or [3,3,5]
Properties	convex, vertex-transitive, edge-transitive

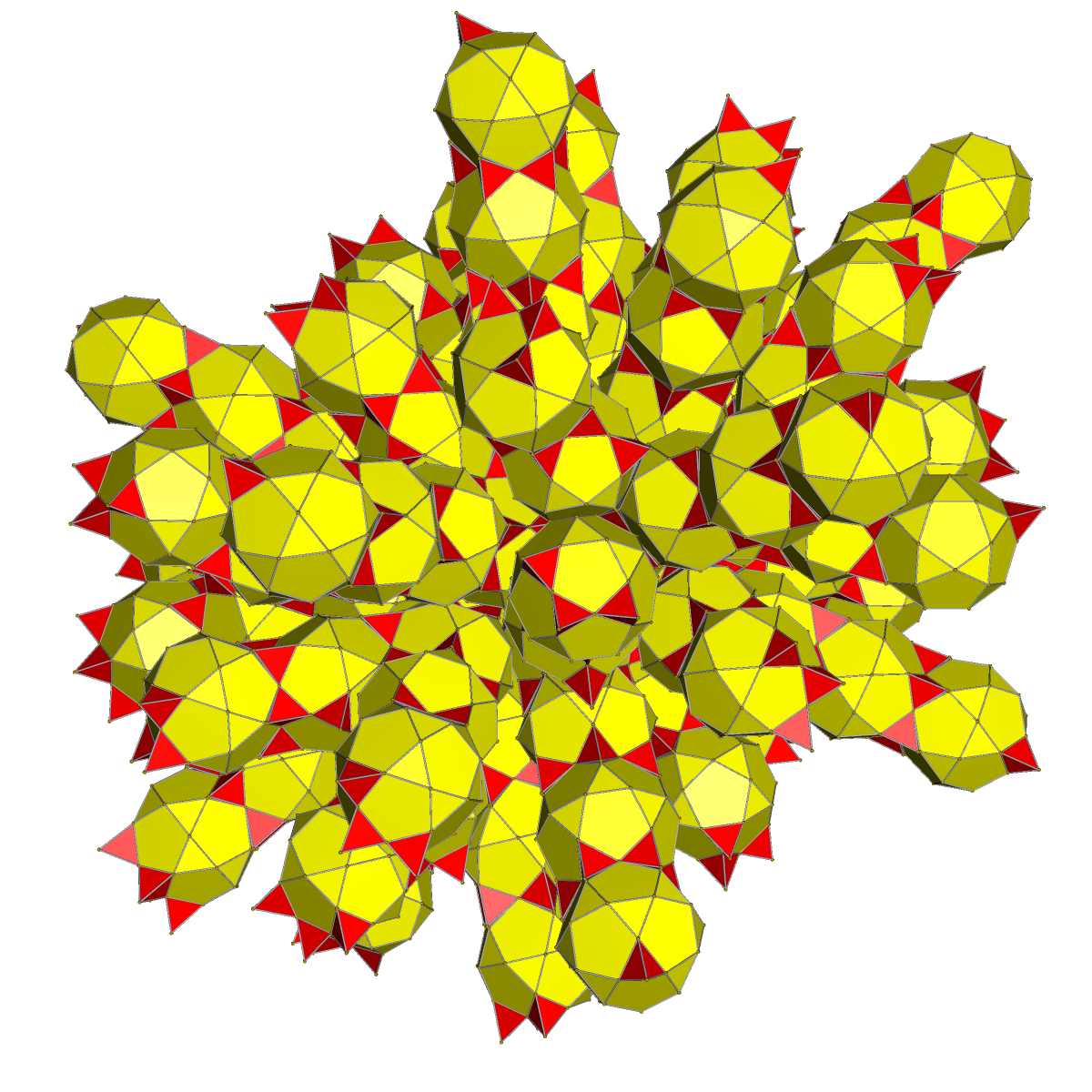
Net

In geometry, the rectified 120-cell or rectified hecatonicosachoron is a convex uniform 4-polytope composed of 600 regular tetrahedra and 120 icosidodecahedra cells. Its vertex figure is a triangular prism, with three icosidodecahedra and two tetrahedra meeting at each vertex.

Alternative names:

- Rectified 120-cell (Norman Johnson)
- Rectified hecatonicosichoron / rectified dodecacontachoron / rectified polydodecahedron
- Icosidodecahedral hexacosihecatonicosachoron
- Rahi (Jonathan Bowers: for rectified hecatonicosachoron)
- Ambohecatonicosachoron (Neil Sloane & John Horton Conway)

== Projections ==
3D parallel projection
Parallel projection of the rectified 120-cell into 3D, centered on an icosidodecahedral cell. Nearest cell to 4D viewpoint shown in orange, and tetrahedral cells shown in yellow. Remaining cells culled so that the structure of the projection is visible.

Orthographic projections by Coxeter planes
H_{4}	-	F_{4}
[30]	[20]	[12]
H_{3}	A_{2} / B_{3} / D_{4}	A_{3} / B_{2}
[10]	[6]	[4]

== Related polytopes ==
H_{4} family polytopes
120-cell	rectified 120-cell	truncated 120-cell	cantellated 120-cell	runcinated 120-cell	cantitruncated 120-cell	runcitruncated 120-cell	omnitruncated 120-cell
{5,3,3}	r{5,3,3}	t{5,3,3}	rr{5,3,3}	t_{0,3}{5,3,3}	tr{5,3,3}	t_{0,1,3}{5,3,3}	t_{0,1,2,3}{5,3,3}
600-cell	rectified 600-cell	truncated 600-cell	cantellated 600-cell	bitruncated 600-cell	cantitruncated 600-cell	runcitruncated 600-cell	omnitruncated 600-cell
{3,3,5}	r{3,3,5}	t{3,3,5}	rr{3,3,5}	2t{3,3,5}	tr{3,3,5}	t_{0,1,3}{3,3,5}	t_{0,1,2,3}{3,3,5}

== Notes ==
Fundamental convex regular and uniform polytopes in dimensions 2–10
Family	A_{n}	B_{n}	I_{2}(p) / D_{n}	E_{6} / E_{7} / E_{8} / F_{4} / G_{2}	H_{n}
Regular polygon	Triangle	Square	p-gon	Hexagon	Pentagon
Uniform polyhedron	Tetrahedron	Octahedron • Cube	Demicube		Dodecahedron • Icosahedron
Uniform polychoron	Pentachoron	16-cell • Tesseract	Demitesseract	24-cell	120-cell • 600-cell
Uniform 5-polytope	5-simplex	5-orthoplex • 5-cube	5-demicube		
Uniform 6-polytope	6-simplex	6-orthoplex • 6-cube	6-demicube	1_{22} • 2_{21}	
Uniform 7-polytope	7-simplex	7-orthoplex • 7-cube	7-demicube	1_{32} • 2_{31} • 3_{21}	
Uniform 8-polytope	8-simplex	8-orthoplex • 8-cube	8-demicube	1_{42} • 2_{41} • 4_{21}	
Uniform 9-polytope	9-simplex	9-orthoplex • 9-cube	9-demicube		
Uniform 10-polytope	10-simplex	10-orthoplex • 10-cube	10-demicube		
Uniform n-polytope	n-simplex	n-orthoplex • n-cube	n-demicube	1_{k2} • 2_{k1} • k_{21}	n-pentagonal polytope
Topics: Polytope families • Regular polytope • List of regular polytopes and compounds • Polytope operations
