= Uniform polytope =

Isogonal polytope with uniform facets

Convex uniform polytopes
| 2D | 3D |
|---|---|
| Truncated triangle or uniform hexagon, with Coxeter diagram. | Truncated octahedron, |
| 4D | 5D |
| Truncated 16-cell, | Truncated 5-orthoplex, |

In geometry, a uniform polytope of dimension three or higher is a vertex-transitive polytope bounded by uniform facets. Here, "vertex-transitive" means that it has symmetries taking every vertex to every other vertex; the same must also be true within each lower-dimensional face of the polytope. In two dimensions (and for two-dimensional faces of higher-dimensional polytopes) a stronger definition is used: only the regular polygons are considered as uniform, disallowing polygons that alternate between two different lengths of edges.

This is a generalization of the older category of semiregular polytopes, but also includes the regular polytopes. Further, star regular faces and vertex figures (star polygons) are allowed, which greatly expand the possible solutions. A strict definition requires uniform polytopes to be finite, while a more expansive definition allows uniform honeycombs (2-dimensional tilings and higher dimensional honeycombs) of Euclidean and hyperbolic space to be considered polytopes as well.

== Operations ==
Nearly every uniform polytope can be generated by a Wythoff construction, and represented by a Coxeter diagram. Notable exceptions include the great dirhombicosidodecahedron in three dimensions and the grand antiprism in four dimensions.

Equivalently, the Wythoffian polytopes can be generated by applying basic operations to the regular polytopes in that dimension. This approach was first used by Johannes Kepler, and is the basis of the Conway polyhedron notation.

=== Rectification operators ===
Regular n-polytopes have n orders of rectification. The zeroth rectification is the original form. The (n−1)-th rectification is the dual. A rectification reduces edges to vertices, a birectification reduces faces to vertices, a trirectification reduces cells to vertices, a quadirectification reduces 4-faces to vertices, a quintirectification reduced 5-faces to vertices, and so on.

An extended Schläfli symbol can be used for representing rectified forms, with a single subscript:

- k-th rectification = t_{k}{p_{1}, p_{2}, ..., p_{n−1}} = kr.

=== Truncation operators ===
Truncation operations that can be applied to regular n-polytopes in any combination. The resulting Coxeter diagram has two ringed nodes, and the operation is named for the distance between them. Truncation cuts vertices, cantellation cuts edges, runcination cuts faces, sterication cut cells. Each higher operation also cuts lower ones too, so a cantellation also truncates vertices.

1. t_{0,1} or t: Truncation - applied to polygons and higher. A truncation removes vertices, and inserts a new facet in place of each former vertex. Faces are truncated, doubling their edges. (The term, coined by Kepler, comes from Latin truncare 'to cut off'.)
  - There are higher truncations also: bitruncation t_{1,2} or 2t, tritruncation t_{2,3} or 3t, quadritruncation t_{3,4} or 4t, quintitruncation t_{4,5} or 5t, etc.
2. t_{0,2} or rr: Cantellation - applied to polyhedra and higher. It can be seen as rectifying its rectification. A cantellation truncates both vertices and edges and replaces them with new facets. Cells are replaced by topologically expanded copies of themselves. (The term, coined by Johnson, is derived from the verb cant, like bevel, meaning to cut with a slanted face.)
  - There are higher cantellations also: bicantellation t_{1,3} or r2r, tricantellation t_{2,4} or r3r, quadricantellation t_{3,5} or r4r, etc.
  - t_{0,1,2} or tr: Cantitruncation - applied to polyhedra and higher. It can be seen as truncating its rectification. A cantitruncation truncates both vertices and edges and replaces them with new facets. Cells are replaced by topologically expanded copies of themselves. (The composite term combines cantellation and truncation)
    - There are higher cantellations also: bicantitruncation t_{1,2,3} or t2r, tricantitruncation t_{2,3,4} or t3r, quadricantitruncation t_{3,4,5} or t4r, etc.
3. t_{0,3}: Runcination - applied to Uniform 4-polytope and higher. Runcination truncates vertices, edges, and faces, replacing them each with new facets. 4-faces are replaced by topologically expanded copies of themselves. (The term, coined by Johnson, is derived from Latin runcina 'carpenter's plane'.)
  - There are higher runcinations also: biruncination t_{1,4}, triruncination t_{2,5}, etc.
4. t_{0,4} or 2r2r: Sterication - applied to Uniform 5-polytopes and higher. Sterication truncates vertices, edges, faces, and cells, replacing each with new facets. 5-faces are replaced by topologically expanded copies of themselves. (The term, coined by Johnson, is derived from Greek stereos 'solid'.)
  - There are higher sterications also: bisterication t_{1,5} or 2r3r, tristerication t_{2,6} or 2r4r, etc.
  - t_{0,2,4} or 2t2r: Stericantellation - applied to Uniform 5-polytopes and higher.
    - There are higher sterications also: bistericantellation t_{1,3,5} or 2t3r, tristericantellation t_{2,4,6} or 2t4r, etc.
5. t_{0,5}: Pentellation - applied to Uniform 6-polytopes and higher. Pentellation truncates vertices, edges, faces, cells, and 4-faces, replacing each with new facets. 6-faces are replaced by topologically expanded copies of themselves. (Pentellation is derived from Greek pente 'five'.)
  - There are also higher pentellations: bipentellation t_{1,6}, tripentellation t_{2,7}, etc.
6. t_{0,6} or 3r3r: Hexication - applied to Uniform 7-polytopes and higher. Hexication truncates vertices, edges, faces, cells, 4-faces, and 5-faces, replacing each with new facets. 7-faces are replaced by topologically expanded copies of themselves. (Hexication is derived from Greek hex 'six'.)
  - There are higher hexications also: bihexication: t_{1,7} or 3r4r, trihexication: t_{2,8} or 3r5r, etc.
  - t_{0,3,6} or 3t3r: Hexiruncinated - applied to Uniform 7-polytopes and higher.
    - There are also higher hexiruncinations: bihexiruncinated: t_{1,4,7} or 3t4r, trihexiruncinated: t_{2,5,8} or 3t5r, etc.
7. t_{0,7}: Heptellation - applied to Uniform 8-polytopes and higher. Heptellation truncates vertices, edges, faces, cells, 4-faces, 5-faces, and 6-faces, replacing each with new facets. 8-faces are replaced by topologically expanded copies of themselves. (Heptellation is derived from Greek hepta 'seven'.)
  - There are higher heptellations also: biheptellation t_{1,8}, triheptellation t_{2,9}, etc.
8. t_{0,8} or 4r4r: Octellation - applied to Uniform 9-polytopes and higher.
9. t_{0,9}: Ennecation - applied to Uniform 10-polytopes and higher.

In addition combinations of truncations can be performed which also generate new uniform polytopes. For example, a runcitruncation is a runcination and truncation applied together.

If all truncations are applied at once, the operation can be more generally called an omnitruncation.

=== Alternation ===
An alternation of a truncated cuboctahedron produces a snub cube.

One special operation, called alternation, removes alternate vertices from a polytope with only even-sided faces. An alternated omnitruncated polytope is called a snub.

The resulting polytopes always can be constructed, and are not generally reflective, and also do not in general have uniform polytope solutions.

The set of polytopes formed by alternating the hypercubes are known as demicubes. In three dimensions, this produces a tetrahedron; in four dimensions, this produces a 16-cell, or demitesseract.

== Vertex figure ==
Uniform polytopes can be constructed from their vertex figure, the arrangement of edges, faces, cells, etc. around each vertex. Uniform polytopes represented by a Coxeter diagram, marking active mirrors by rings, have reflectional symmetry, and can be simply constructed by recursive reflections of the vertex figure.

A smaller number of nonreflectional uniform polytopes have a single vertex figure but are not repeated by simple reflections. Most of these can be represented with operations like alternation of other uniform polytopes.

Vertex figures for single-ringed Coxeter diagrams can be constructed from the diagram by removing the ringed node, and ringing neighboring nodes. Such vertex figures are themselves vertex-transitive.

Multiringed polytopes can be constructed by a slightly more complicated construction process, and their topology is not a uniform polytope. For example, the vertex figure of a truncated regular polytope (with 2 rings) is a pyramid. An omnitruncated polytope (all nodes ringed) will always have an irregular simplex as its vertex figure.

== Circumradius ==
Uniform polytopes have equal edge-lengths, and all vertices are an equal distance from the center, called the circumradius.

Uniform polytopes whose circumradius is equal to the edge length can be used as vertex figures for uniform honeycombs. For example, the regular hexagon divides into 6 equilateral triangles and is the vertex figure for the regular triangular tiling. Also the cuboctahedron divides into 8 regular tetrahedra and 6 square pyramids (half octahedron), and it is the vertex figure for the alternated cubic honeycomb.

== Uniform polytopes by dimension ==
It is useful to classify the uniform polytopes by dimension. This is equivalent to the number of nodes on the Coxeter diagram, or the number of hyperplanes in the Wythoffian construction. Because (n+1)-dimensional polytopes are tilings of n-dimensional spherical space, tilings of n-dimensional Euclidean and hyperbolic space are also considered to be (n+1)-dimensional. Hence, the tilings of two-dimensional space are grouped with the three-dimensional solids.

=== One dimension ===
The only one-dimensional polytope is the line segment. It corresponds to the Coxeter family A_{1}.

=== Two dimensions ===
In two dimensions, there is an infinite family of convex uniform polytopes, the regular polygons, the simplest being the equilateral triangle. Truncated regular polygons become bicolored geometrically quasiregular polygons of twice as many sides, t{p}={2p}. The first few regular polygons (and quasiregular forms) are displayed below:

| Name | Triangle (2-simplex) | Square (2-orthoplex) (2-cube) | Pentagon | Hexagon | Heptagon | Octagon | Enneagon | Decagon | Hendecagon |
|---|---|---|---|---|---|---|---|---|---|
| Schläfli | {3} | {4} t{2} | {5} | {6} t{3} | {7} | {8} t{4} | {9} | {10} t{5} | {11} |
| Coxeter diagram | | | | | | | | | |
| Image | | | | | | | | | |
| Name | Dodecagon | Tridecagon | Tetradecagon | Pentadecagon | Hexadecagon | Heptadecagon | Octadecagon | Enneadecagon | Icosagon |
| Schläfli | {12} t{6} | {13} | {14} t{7} | {15} | {16} t{8} | {17} | {18} t{9} | {19} | {20} t{10} |
| Coxeter diagram | | | | | | | | | |
| Image | | | | | | | | | |

There is also an infinite set of star polygons (one for each rational number greater than 2), but these are non-convex. The simplest example is the pentagram, which corresponds to the rational number 5/2. Regular star polygons, {p/q}, can be truncated into semiregular star polygons, t{p/q}=t{2p/q}, but become double-coverings if q is even. A truncation can also be made with a reverse orientation polygon t{p/(p−q)}={2p/(p−q)}, for example t{5/3}={10/3}.

| Name | Pentagram | Heptagrams | | Octagram | Enneagrams | | Decagram | ...n-grams |
| Schläfli | {5/2} | {7/2} | {7/3} | {8/3} t{4/3} | {9/2} | {9/4} | {10/3} t{5/3} | {p/q} |
| Coxeter diagram | | | | | | | | |
| Image | | | | | | | | |

Regular polygons, represented by Schläfli symbol {p} for a p-gon. Regular polygons are self-dual, so the rectification produces the same polygon. The uniform truncation operation doubles the sides to {2p}. The snub operation, alternating the truncation, restores the original polygon {p}. Thus all uniform polygons are also regular. The following operations can be performed on regular polygons to derive the uniform polygons, which are also regular polygons:

| Operation | Extended Schläfli Symbols | | Regular result | Coxeter diagram | Position | | Symmetry |
| Operation | Extended Schläfli Symbols | | Regular result | Coxeter diagram | (1) | (0) | Symmetry |
|---|---|---|---|---|---|---|---|
| Parent | {p} | t_{0}{p} | {p} | | {} | -- | [p] (order 2p) |
| Rectified (Dual) | r{p} | t_{1}{p} | {p} | | -- | {} | [p] (order 2p) |
| Truncated | t{p} | t_{0,1}{p} | {2p} | | {} | {} | [[p]]=[2p] (order 4p) |
| Half | h{2p} | | {p} | | -- | -- | [1^{+},2p]=[p] (order 2p) |
| Snub | s{p} | | {p} | | -- | -- | [[p]]^{+}=[p] (order 2p) |

=== Three dimensions ===
In three dimensions, the situation gets more interesting. There are five convex regular polyhedra, known as the Platonic solids:

| Name | Schläfli {p,q} | Diagram | Image (transparent) | Image (solid) | Image (sphere) | Faces {p} | Edges | Vertices {q} | Symmetry | Dual |
|---|---|---|---|---|---|---|---|---|---|---|
| Tetrahedron (3-simplex) (Pyramid) | {3,3} | | | | | 4 {3} | 6 | 4 {3} | T_{d} | (self) |
| Cube (3-cube) (Hexahedron) | {4,3} | | | | | 6 {4} | 12 | 8 {3} | O_{h} | Octahedron |
| Octahedron (3-orthoplex) | {3,4} | | | | | 8 {3} | 12 | 6 {4} | O_{h} | Cube |
| Dodecahedron | {5,3} | | | | | 12 {5} | 30 | 20 {3}2 | I_{h} | Icosahedron |
| Icosahedron | {3,5} | | | | | 20 {3} | 30 | 12 {5} | I_{h} | Dodecahedron |

In addition to these, there are also 13 semiregular polyhedra, or Archimedean solids, which can be obtained via Wythoff constructions, or by performing operations such as truncation on the Platonic solids, as demonstrated in the following table:

| | Parent | Truncated | Rectified | Bitruncated (tr. dual) | Birectified (dual) | Cantellated | Omnitruncated (Cantitruncated) | Snub |
|---|---|---|---|---|---|---|---|---|
| Tetrahedral; 3-3-2 | {3,3} | (3.6.6) | (3.3.3.3) | (3.6.6) | {3,3} | (3.4.3.4) | (4.6.6) | (3.3.3.3.3) |
| Octahedral; 4-3-2 | {4,3} | (3.8.8) | (3.4.3.4) | (4.6.6) | {3,4} | (3.4.4.4) | (4.6.8) | (3.3.3.3.4) |
| Icosahedral; 5-3-2 | {5,3} | (3.10.10) | (3.5.3.5) | (5.6.6) | {3,5} | (3.4.5.4) | (4.6.10) | (3.3.3.3.5) |

There is also the infinite set of prisms, one for each regular polygon, and a corresponding set of antiprisms.

| # | Name | Picture | Tiling | Vertex figure | Diagram and Schläfli symbols |
|---|---|---|---|---|---|
| P_{2p} | Prism | | | | tr{2,p} |
| A_{p} | Antiprism | | | | sr{2,p} |

The uniform star polyhedra include a further 4 regular star polyhedra, the Kepler-Poinsot polyhedra, and 53 semiregular star polyhedra. There are also two infinite sets, the star prisms (one for each star polygon) and star antiprisms (one for each rational number greater than 3/2).

==== Constructions ====
The Wythoffian uniform polyhedra and tilings can be defined by their Wythoff symbol, which specifies the fundamental region of the object. An extension of Schläfli notation, also used by Coxeter, applies to all dimensions; it consists of the letter 't', followed by a series of subscripted numbers corresponding to the ringed nodes of the Coxeter diagram, and followed by the Schläfli symbol of the regular seed polytope. For example, the truncated octahedron is represented by the notation: t_{0,1}{3,4}.

| Operation | Schläfli Symbol | | | Coxeter diagram | Wythoff symbol | Position: | | | | | |
|---|---|---|---|---|---|---|---|---|---|---|---|
| Parent | $\begin{Bmatrix} p , q \end{Bmatrix}$ | {p,q} | t_{0}{p,q} | | q | 2 p | {p} | { } | -- | -- | -- | { } |
| Birectified (or dual) | $\begin{Bmatrix} q , p \end{Bmatrix}$ | {q,p} | t_{2}{p,q} | | p | 2 q | -- | { } | {q} | { } | -- | -- |
| Truncated | $t\begin{Bmatrix} p , q \end{Bmatrix}$ | t{p,q} | t_{0,1}{p,q} | | 2 q | p | {2p} | { } | {q} | -- | { } | { } |
| Bitruncated (or truncated dual) | $t\begin{Bmatrix} q , p \end{Bmatrix}$ | t{q,p} | t_{1,2}{p,q} | | 2 p | q | {p} | { } | {2q} | { } | { } | -- |
| Rectified | $\begin{Bmatrix} p \\ q \end{Bmatrix}$ | r{p,q} | t_{1}{p,q} | | 2 | p q | {p} | -- | {q} | -- | { } | -- |
| Cantellated (or expanded) | $r\begin{Bmatrix} p \\ q \end{Bmatrix}$ | rr{p,q} | t_{0,2}{p,q} | | p q | 2 | {p} | { }×{ } | {q} | { } | -- | { } |
| Cantitruncated (or Omnitruncated) | $t\begin{Bmatrix} p \\ q \end{Bmatrix}$ | tr{p,q} | t_{0,1,2}{p,q} | | 2 p q | | {2p} | { }×{} | {2q} | { } | { } | { } |

| Operation | Schläfli Symbol | | | Coxeter diagram | Wythoff symbol | Position: | | | | | |
|---|---|---|---|---|---|---|---|---|---|---|---|
| Snub rectified | $s\begin{Bmatrix} p \\ q \end{Bmatrix}$ | sr{p,q} | | | | 2 p q | {p} | {3} {3} | {q} | -- | -- | -- |
| Snub | $s\begin{Bmatrix} p , q \end{Bmatrix}$ | s{p,2q} | ht_{0,1}{p,q} | | | s{2p} | {3} | {q} | -- | {3} | |

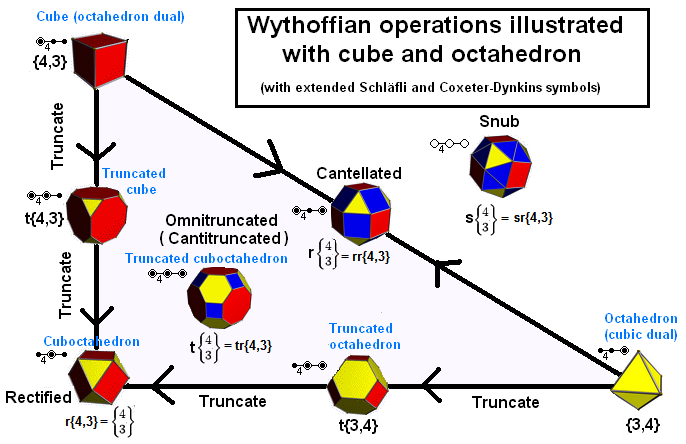
| Generating triangles |

=== Four dimensions ===
In four dimensions, there are 6 convex regular 4-polytopes, 17 prisms on the Platonic and Archimedean solids (excluding the cube-prism, which has already been counted as the tesseract), and two infinite sets: the prisms on the convex antiprisms, and the duoprisms. There are also 41 convex semiregular 4-polytopes, including the non-Wythoffian grand antiprism and the snub 24-cell. Both of these special 4-polytopes are composed of subgroups of the vertices of the 600-cell.

The four-dimensional uniform star polytopes have not all been enumerated. The ones that have include the 10 regular star (Schläfli-Hess) 4-polytopes and 57 prisms on the uniform star polyhedra, as well as three infinite families: the prisms on the star antiprisms, the duoprisms formed by multiplying two star polygons, and the duoprisms formed by multiplying an ordinary polygon with a star polygon. There is an unknown number of 4-polytopes that do not fit into the above categories; over one thousand have been discovered so far.

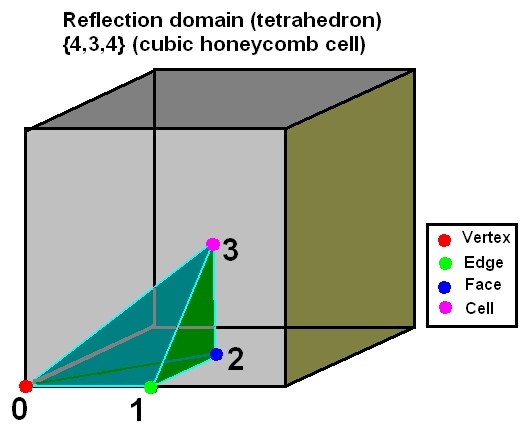
Example tetrahedron in cubic honeycomb cell. There are 3 right dihedral angles (2 intersecting perpendicular mirrors): Edges 1 to 2, 0 to 2, and 1 to 3.

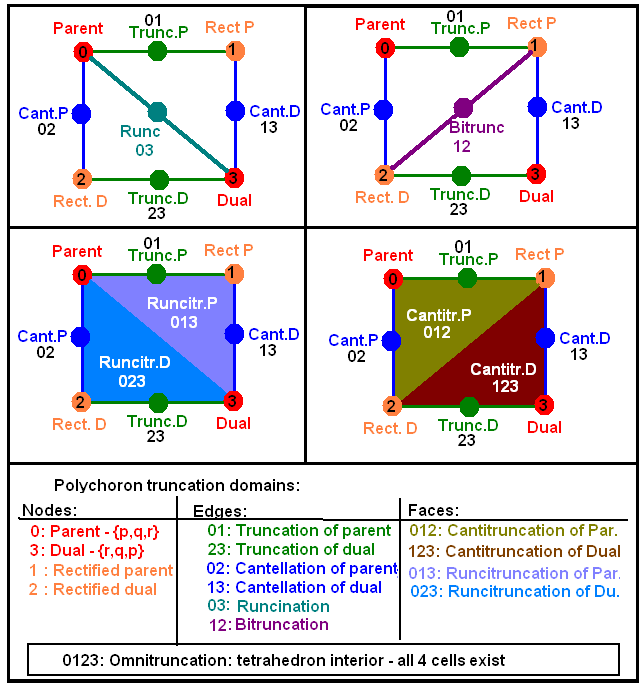
Summary chart of truncation operations

Every regular polytope can be seen as the images of a fundamental region in a small number of mirrors. In a 4-dimensional polytope (or 3-dimensional cubic honeycomb) the fundamental region is bounded by four mirrors. A mirror in 4-space is a three-dimensional hyperplane, but it is more convenient for our purposes to consider only its two-dimensional intersection with the three-dimensional surface of the hypersphere; thus the mirrors form an irregular tetrahedron.

Each of the sixteen regular 4-polytopes is generated by one of four symmetry groups, as follows:

- group [3,3,3]: the 5-cell {3,3,3}, which is self-dual;
- group [3,3,4]: 16-cell {3,3,4} and its dual tesseract {4,3,3};
- group [3,4,3]: the 24-cell {3,4,3}, self-dual;
- group [3,3,5]: 600-cell {3,3,5}, its dual 120-cell {5,3,3}, and their ten regular stellations.
- group [3^{1,1,1}]: contains only repeated members of the [3,3,4] family.

(The groups are named in Coxeter notation.)

Eight of the convex uniform honeycombs in Euclidean 3-space are analogously generated from the cubic honeycomb {4,3,4}, by applying the same operations used to generate the Wythoffian uniform 4-polytopes.

For a given symmetry simplex, a generating point may be placed on any of the four vertices, 6 edges, 4 faces, or the interior volume. On each of these 15 elements there is a point whose images, reflected in the four mirrors, are the vertices of a uniform 4-polytope.

The extended Schläfli symbols are made by a t followed by inclusion of one to four subscripts 0,1,2,3. If there is one subscript, the generating point is on a corner of the fundamental region, i.e. a point where three mirrors meet. These corners are notated as

- 0: vertex of the parent 4-polytope (center of the dual's cell)
- 1: center of the parent's edge (center of the dual's face)
- 2: center of the parent's face (center of the dual's edge)
- 3: center of the parent's cell (vertex of the dual)

(For the two self-dual 4-polytopes, "dual" means a similar 4-polytope in dual position.) Two or more subscripts mean that the generating point is between the corners indicated.

==== Constructive summary ====
The 15 constructive forms by family are summarized below. The self-dual families are listed in one column, and others as two columns with shared entries on the symmetric Coxeter diagrams. The final 10th row lists the snub 24-cell constructions. This includes all nonprismatic uniform 4-polytopes, except for the non-Wythoffian grand antiprism, which has no Coxeter family.

| A_{4} | BC_{4} | | D_{4} | F_{4} | H_{4} | |
| [3,3,3] | [4,3,3] | | [3,3^{1,1}] | [3,4,3] | [5,3,3] | |
|---|---|---|---|---|---|---|
| 5-cell {3,3,3} | 16-cell {3,3,4} | tesseract {4,3,3} | demitesseract {3,3^{1,1}} | 24-cell {3,4,3} | 600-cell {3,3,5} | 120-cell {5,3,3} |
| rectified 5-cell r{3,3,3} | rectified 16-cell r{3,3,4} | rectified tesseract r{4,3,3} | rectified demitesseract r{3,3^{1,1}} | rectified 24-cell r{3,4,3} | rectified 600-cell r{3,3,5} | rectified 120-cell r{5,3,3} |
| truncated 5-cell t{3,3,3} | truncated 16-cell t{3,3,4} | truncated tesseract t{4,3,3} | truncated demitesseract t{3,3^{1,1}} | truncated 24-cell t{3,4,3} | truncated 600-cell t{3,3,5} | truncated 120-cell t{5,3,3} |
| cantellated 5-cell rr{3,3,3} | cantellated 16-cell rr{3,3,4} | cantellated tesseract rr{4,3,3} | cantellated demitesseract 2r{3,3^{1,1}} | cantellated 24-cell rr{3,4,3} | cantellated 600-cell rr{3,3,5} | cantellated 120-cell rr{5,3,3} |
| runcinated 5-cell t_{0,3}{3,3,3} | runcinated 16-cell t_{0,3}{3,3,4} | runcinated tesseract t_{0,3}{4,3,3} | | runcinated 24-cell t_{0,3}{3,4,3} | runcinated 600-cell runcinated 120-cell t_{0,3}{3,3,5} | |
| bitruncated 5-cell t_{1,2}{3,3,3} | bitruncated 16-cell 2t{3,3,4} | bitruncated tesseract 2t{4,3,3} | cantitruncated demitesseract 2t{3,3^{1,1}} | bitruncated 24-cell 2t{3,4,3} | bitruncated 600-cell bitruncated 120-cell 2t{3,3,5} | |
| cantitruncated 5-cell tr{3,3,3} | cantitruncated 16-cell tr{3,3,4} | cantitruncated tesseract tr{4,3,3} | omnitruncated demitesseract tr{3,3^{1,1}} | cantitruncated 24-cell tr{3,4,3} | cantitruncated 600-cell tr{3,3,5} | cantitruncated 120-cell tr{5,3,3} |
| runcitruncated 5-cell t_{0,1,3}{3,3,3} | runcitruncated 16-cell t_{0,1,3}{3,3,4} | runcitruncated tesseract t_{0,1,3}{4,3,3} | runcicantellated demitesseract rr{3,3^{1,1}} | runcitruncated 24-cell t_{0,1,3}{3,4,3} | runcitruncated 600-cell t_{0,1,3}{3,3,5} | runcitruncated 120-cell t_{0,1,3}{5,3,3} |
| omnitruncated 5-cell t_{0,1,2,3}{3,3,3} | omnitruncated 16-cell t_{0,1,2,3}{3,3,4} | omnitruncated tesseract t_{0,1,2,3}{3,3,4} | | omnitruncated 24-cell t_{0,1,2,3}{3,4,3} | omnitruncated 120-cell omnitruncated 600-cell t_{0,1,2,3}{5,3,3} | |
| | alternated cantitruncated 16-cell sr{3,3,4} | | snub demitesseract sr{3,3^{1,1}} | Alternated truncated 24-cell s{3,4,3} | | |

==== Truncated forms ====
The following table defines 15 forms of truncation. Each form can have from one to four cell types, located in positions 0,1,2,3 as defined above. The cells are labeled by polyhedral truncation notation.

- An n-gonal prism is represented as : {n}×{ }.
- The green background is shown on forms that are equivalent to either the parent or the dual.
- The red background shows the truncations of the parent, and blue the truncations of the dual.

| Operation | Schläfli symbol | | Coxeter diagram | Cells by position: | | | |
| Operation | Schläfli symbol | | Coxeter diagram | (3) | (2) | (1) | (0) |
|---|---|---|---|---|---|---|---|
| Parent | {p,q,r} | t_{0}{p,q,r} | | {p,q} | -- | -- | -- |
| Rectified | r{p,q,r} | t_{1}{p,q,r} | | r{p,q} | -- | -- | {q,r} |
| Birectified (or rectified dual) | 2r{p,q,r} = r{r,q,p} | t_{2}{p,q,r} | | {q,p} | -- | -- | r{q,r} |
| Trirectifed (or dual) | 3r{p,q,r} = {r,q,p} | t_{3}{p,q,r} | | -- | -- | -- | {r,q} |
| Truncated | t{p,q,r} | t_{0,1}{p,q,r} | | t{p,q} | -- | -- | {q,r} |
| Bitruncated | 2t{p,q,r} | 2t{p,q,r} | | t{q,p} | -- | -- | t{q,r} |
| Tritruncated (or truncated dual) | 3t{p,q,r} = t{r,q,p} | t_{2,3}{p,q,r} | | {q,p} | -- | -- | t{r,q} |
| Cantellated | rr{p,q,r} | t_{0,2}{p,q,r} | | rr{p,q} | -- | { }×{r} | r{q,r} |
| Bicantellated (or cantellated dual) | r2r{p,q,r} = rr{r,q,p} | t_{1,3}{p,q,r} | | r{p,q} | {p}×{ } | -- | rr{q,r} |
| Runcinated (or expanded) | e{p,q,r} | t_{0,3}{p,q,r} | | {p,q} | {p}×{ } | { }×{r} | {r,q} |
| Cantitruncated | tr{p,q,r} | tr{p,q,r} | | tr{p,q} | -- | { }×{r} | t{q,r} |
| Bicantitruncated (or cantitruncated dual) | t2r{p,q,r} = tr{r,q,p} | t_{1,2,3}{p,q,r} | | t{q,p} | {p}×{ } | -- | tr{q,r} |
| Runcitruncated | e_{t}{p,q,r} | t_{0,1,3}{p,q,r} | | t{p,q} | {2p}×{ } | { }×{r} | rr{q,r} |
| Runcicantellated (or runcitruncated dual) | e_{3t}{p,q,r} = e_{t}{r,q,p} | t_{0,2,3}{p,q,r} | | tr{p,q} | {p}×{ } | { }×{2r} | t{r,q} |
| Runcicantitruncated (or omnitruncated) | o{p,q,r} | t_{0,1,2,3}{p,q,r} | | tr{p,q} | {2p}×{ } | { }×{2r} | tr{q,r} |

==== Half forms ====
Half constructions exist with holes rather than ringed nodes. Branches neighboring holes and inactive nodes must be even-order. Half construction have the vertices of an identically ringed construction.

| Operation | Schläfli symbol | | Coxeter diagram | Cells by position: | | | |
| Operation | Schläfli symbol | | Coxeter diagram | (3) | (2) | (1) | (0) |
|---|---|---|---|---|---|---|---|
| Half; Alternated | h{p,2q,r} | ht_{0}{p,2q,r} | | h{p,2q} | -- | -- | -- |
| Alternated rectified | hr{2p,2q,r} | ht_{1}{2p,2q,r} | | hr{2p,2q} | -- | -- | h{2q,r} |
| Snub; Alternated truncation | s{p,2q,r} | ht_{0,1}{p,2q,r} | | s{p,2q} | -- | -- | h{2q,r} |
| Bisnub; Alternated bitruncation | 2s{2p,q,2r} | ht_{1,2}{2p,q,2r} | | s{q,2p} | -- | -- | s{q,2r} |
| Snub rectified Alternated truncated rectified | sr{p,q,2r} | ht_{0,1,2}{p,q,2r} | | sr{p,q} | -- | s{2,2r} | s{q,2r} |
| Omnisnub; Alternated omnitruncation | os{p,q,r} | ht_{0,1,2,3}{p,q,r} | | sr{p,q} | {p}×{ } | { }×{r} | sr{q,r} |

=== Five and higher dimensions ===
In five and higher dimensions, there are 3 regular polytopes, the hypercube, simplex and cross-polytope. They are generalisations of the three-dimensional cube, tetrahedron and octahedron, respectively. There are no regular star polytopes in these dimensions. Most uniform higher-dimensional polytopes are obtained by modifying the regular polytopes, or by taking the Cartesian product of polytopes of lower dimensions.

In six, seven and eight dimensions, the exceptional simple Lie groups, E_{6}, E_{7} and E_{8} come into play. By placing rings on a nonzero number of nodes of the Coxeter diagrams, one can obtain 39 new 6-polytopes, 127 new 7-polytopes and 255 new 8-polytopes. A notable example is the 4_{21} polytope.

== Uniform honeycombs ==
Related to the subject of finite uniform polytopes are uniform honeycombs in Euclidean and hyperbolic spaces. Euclidean uniform honeycombs are generated by affine Coxeter groups and hyperbolic honeycombs are generated by the hyperbolic Coxeter groups. Two affine Coxeter groups can be multiplied together.

There are two classes of hyperbolic Coxeter groups, compact and paracompact. Uniform honeycombs generated by compact groups have finite facets and vertex figures, and exist in 2 through 4 dimensions. Paracompact groups have affine or hyperbolic subgraphs, and infinite facets or vertex figures, and exist in 2 through 10 dimensions.

== See also ==
- Schläfli symbol

Fundamental convex regular and uniform polytopes
| Family | A_{n} | B_{n} | I_{2}(p) / D_{n} | E_{6} / E_{7} / E_{8} / F_{4} / G_{2} | H_{n} |
| Regular polygon | Triangle | Square | p-gon | Hexagon | Pentagon |
| Uniform polyhedron | Tetrahedron | Octahedron • Cube | Demicube | | Dodecahedron • Icosahedron |
| Uniform polychoron | Pentachoron | 16-cell • Tesseract | Demitesseract | 24-cell | 120-cell • 600-cell |
| Uniform 5-polytope | 5-simplex | 5-orthoplex • 5-cube | 5-demicube | | |
| Uniform 6-polytope | 6-simplex | 6-orthoplex • 6-cube | 6-demicube | 1_{22} • 2_{21} | |
| Uniform 7-polytope | 7-simplex | 7-orthoplex • 7-cube | 7-demicube | 1_{32} • 2_{31} • 3_{21} | |
| Uniform 8-polytope | 8-simplex | 8-orthoplex • 8-cube | 8-demicube | 1_{42} • 2_{41} • 4_{21} | |
| Uniform n-polytope | n-simplex | n-orthoplex • n-cube | n-demicube | 1_{k2} • 2_{k1} • k_{21} | n-pentagonal polytope |
Topics: Polytope families • Regular polytope • List of regular polytopes and compounds • Polytope operations
