= 120-cell =

Four-dimensional analog of the dodecahedron

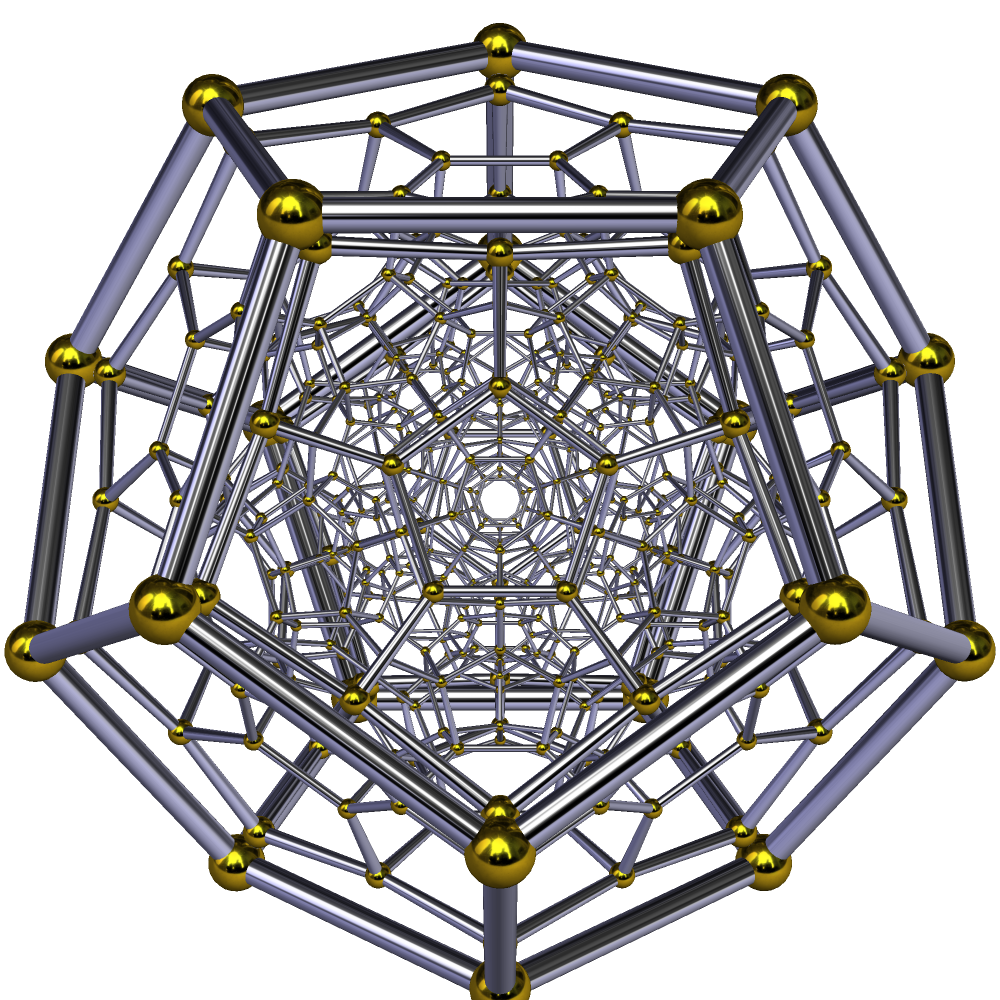
- Schlegel diagram (vertices and edges)
- Type: Convex regular 4-polytope
- Schläfli symbol: {5,3,3}
- Cells: 120 {5,3}
- Faces: 720 {5}
- Edges: 1200
- Vertices: 600
- Vertex figure: Tetrahedron
- Petrie polygon: 30-gon
- Coxeter group: H_{4}, [3,3,5]
- Dual: 600-cell
- Properties: convex, isogonal, isotoxal, isohedral
- Uniform index: 32

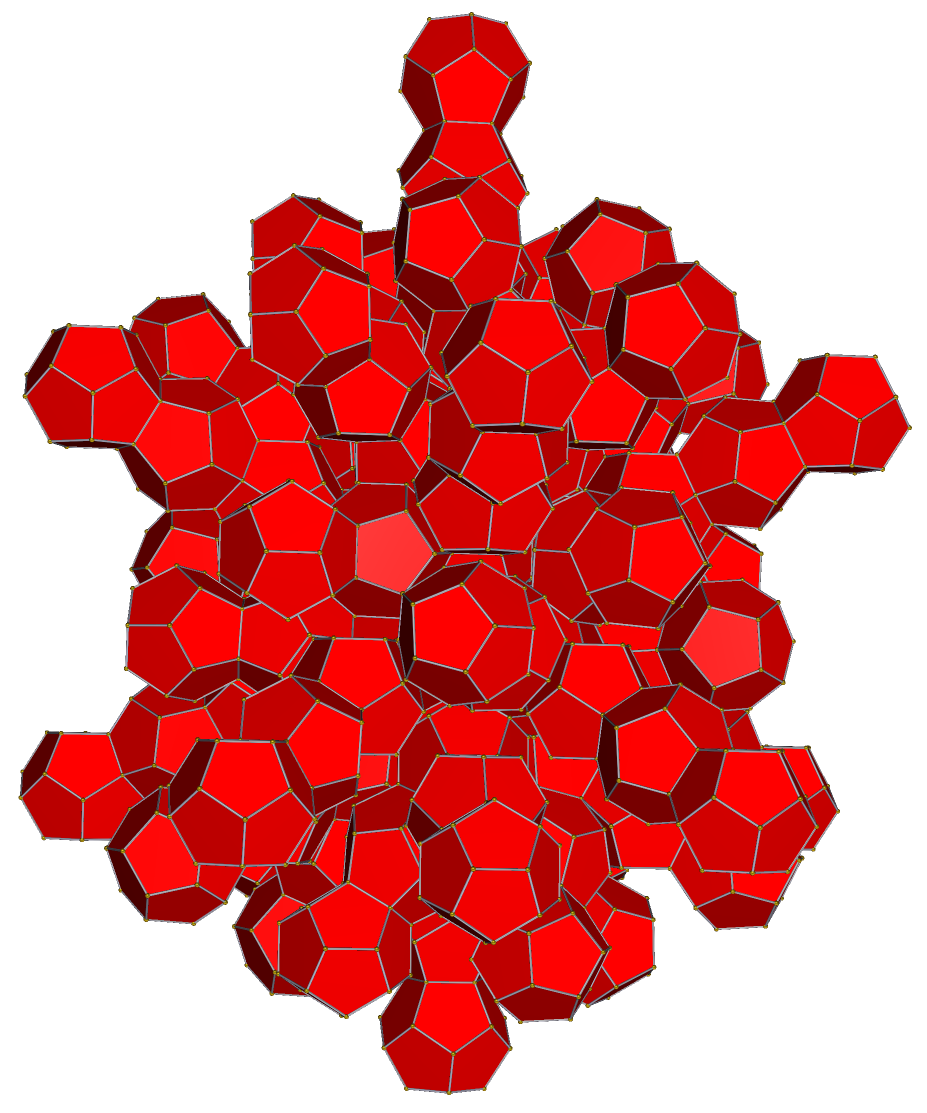
Net

In geometry, the 120-cell is the convex regular 4-polytope (four-dimensional analogue of a Platonic solid) with Schläfli symbol {5,3,3}. It is also called a C_{120}, dodecaplex (short for "dodecahedral complex"), hyperdodecahedron, polydodecahedron, hecatonicosachoron, dodecacontachoron and hecatonicosahedroid.

The boundary of the 120-cell is composed of 120 dodecahedral cells with 4 meeting at each vertex. Together they form 720 pentagonal faces, 1200 edges, and 600 vertices. It is the 4-dimensional analogue of the regular dodecahedron, since just as a dodecahedron has 12 pentagonal facets, with 3 around each vertex, the dodecaplex has 120 dodecahedral facets, with 3 around each edge. (Note: In the 120-cell, 3 dodecahedra and 3 pentagons meet at every edge. 4 dodecahedra, 6 pentagons, and 4 edges meet at every vertex. The dihedral angle (between dodecahedral hyperplanes) is 144°.) Its dual polytope is the 600-cell.

== Geometry ==
The 120-cell incorporates the geometries of every convex regular polytope in the first four dimensions (except the polygons {7} and above). (Note: The 120-cell contains instances of all of the regular convex 1-polytopes, 2-polytopes, 3-polytopes and 4-polytopes, except for the regular polygons {7} and above, most of which do not occur. {10} is a notable exception which does occur. Various regular skew polygons {7} and above occur in the 120-cell, notably {11}, (Note: The Petrie polygon of the inscribed 600-cells can be seen in this projection to the plane of a triacontagram {30/11}, a 30-gram of #11 chords. The 600-cell Petrie is a helical ring which winds around its own axis 11 times. This projection along the axis of the ring cylinder shows the 30 vertices 12° apart around the cylinder's circular cross section, with #11 chords connecting every 11th vertex on the circle. The 600-cell edges (#3 chords) which are the Petrie polygon edges are not shown in this illustration, but they could be drawn around the circumference, connecting every 3rd vertex. The 600-cell Petrie polygon is a helical ring which twists around its 0-gon great circle axis 11 times in the course of one circular orbit. Projected to the plane completely orthogonal to the 0-gon plane, the 600-cell Petrie polygon can be seen to be a triacontagram {30/11} of 30 #11 chords linking pairs of vertices that are 11 vertices apart on the circumference of the projection. The {30/11}-gram (with its #11 chord edges) is an alternate sequence of the same 30 vertices as the Petrie 30-gon (with its #3 chord edges).) {15} (Note: In triacontagram {30/8}=2{15/4}, 2 disjoint pentadecagram isoclines are visible: a black and a white isocline (shown here as orange and faint yellow) of the 120-cell's characteristic isoclinic rotation. (Note: Each black or white pentadecagram isocline acts as both a right isocline in a distinct right isoclinic rotation and as a left isocline in a distinct left isoclinic rotation, but isoclines do not have inherent chirality. (Note: An isocline is a closed, curved, helical great circle through all four dimensions. Unlike an ordinary great circle it does not lie in a single central plane, but like any great circle, when viewed within the curved 3-dimensional space of the 4-polytope's boundary surface it is a straight line, a geodesic. Both ordinary great circles and isocline great circles are helical in the sense that parallel bundles of great circles are linked and spiral around each other, but neither are actually twisted (they have no inherent torsion). Their curvature is not their own, but a property of the 3-sphere's natural curvature, within which curved space they are finite (closed) straight line segments. (Note: All 3-sphere isoclines of the same circumference are directly congruent circles. An ordinary great circle is an isocline of circumference $2\pi r$; simple rotations of unit-radius polytopes take place on 2𝝅 isoclines. Double rotations may have isoclines of other than $2\pi r$ circumference. The characteristic rotation of a regular 4-polytope is the isoclinic rotation in which the central planes containing its edges are invariant planes of rotation. The 16-cell and 24-cell edge-rotate on isoclines of 4𝝅 circumference. The 600-cell edge-rotates on isoclines of 5𝝅 circumference.) To avoid confusion, we always refer to an isocline as such, and reserve the term great circle for an ordinary great circle in the plane.) No isocline is both a right and left isocline of the same discrete left-right rotation (the same fibration).) The pentadecagram edges are #4 chords (Note: The characteristic isoclinic rotation of the 120-cell, in the invariant planes in which its edges (#1 chords) lie, takes those edges to similar edges in Clifford parallel central planes. Since an isoclinic rotation (Note: An isoclinic (Note: Two angles are required to specify the separation between two planes in 4-space. If the two angles are identical, the two planes are called isoclinic (also Clifford parallel) and they intersect in a single point. In double rotations, points rotate within invariant central planes of rotation by some angle, and the entire invariant central plane of rotation also tilts sideways (in an orthogonal invariant central plane of rotation) by some angle. Therefore each vertex traverses a helical smooth curve called an isocline between two points in different central planes, while traversing an ordinary great circle in each of two orthogonal central planes (as the planes tilt relative to their original planes). If the two orthogonal angles are identical, the distance traveled along each great circle is the same, and the double rotation is called isoclinic (also a Clifford displacement). A rotation which takes isoclinic central planes to each other is an isoclinic rotation.) rotation is an equi-rotation-angled double rotation in two completely orthogonal invariant central planes of rotation at the same time. Every discrete isoclinic rotation has two characteristic arc-angles (chord lengths), its rotation angle and its isocline angle. (Note: Every class of discrete isoclinic rotation is characterized by its rotation and isocline angles and by which set of Clifford parallel central planes are its invariant planes of rotation. The characteristic isoclinic rotation of a 4-polytope is the class of discrete isoclinic rotation in which the set of invariant rotation planes contains the 4-polytope's edges; there is a distinct left (and right) rotation for each such set of Clifford parallel central planes (each Hopf fibration of the edge planes). If the edges of the 4-polytope form regular great circles, the rotation angle of the characteristic rotation is simply the edge arc-angle (the edge chord is simply the rotation chord). But in a regular 4-polytope with a tetrahedral vertex figure (Note: The 5-cell, 8-cell and 120-cell all have tetrahedral vertex figures. In a 4-polytope with a tetrahedral vertex figure, a path along edges does not lie on an ordinary great circle in a single central plane: each successive edge lies in a different central plane than the previous edge. In the 120-cell the 30-edge circumferential path along edges follows a zig-zag skew Petrie polygon, which is not a great circle. However, there exists a 15-chord circumferential path that is a true geodesic great circle through those 15 vertices: but it is not an ordinary "flat" great circle of circumference 2𝝅𝑟, it is a helical isocline that bends in a circle in two completely orthogonal central planes at once, circling through four dimensions rather than confined to a two dimensional plane. (Note: The characteristic isocline of the 120-cell is a skew pentadecagram of 15 #4 chords. Successive #4 chords of each pentadecagram lie in different △ central planes which are inclined isoclinically to each other at 12°, which is 1/30 of a great circle (but not the arc of a 120-cell edge, the #1 chord). (Note: In the 120-cell's isoclinic rotations the rotation arc-angle is 12° (1/30 of a circle), not the 15.5~° arc of the #1 edge chord. Regardless of which central planes are the invariant rotation planes, any 120-cell isoclinic rotation by 12° will take the great polygon in every central plane to a congruent great polygon in a Clifford parallel central plane that is 12° away. Adjacent Clifford parallel great polygons (of every kind) are completely disjoint, and their nearest vertices are connected by two 120-cell edges (#1 chords of arc-length 15.5~°). The 12° rotation angle is not the arc of any vertex-to-vertex chord in the 120-cell. It occurs only as the two equal angles between adjacent Clifford parallel central planes, and it is the separation between adjacent rotation planes in all the 120-cell's various isoclinic rotations (not only in its characteristic rotation).) This means that the two planes are separated by two equal 12° angles, and they are occupied by adjacent Clifford parallel great polygons (irregular great hexagons) whose corresponding vertices are joined by oblique #4 chords. Successive vertices of each pentadecagram are vertices in completely disjoint 5-cells. Each pentadecagram is a #4 chord-path visiting 15 vertices belonging to three different 5-cells. The two pentadecagrams shown in the {30/8}=2{15/4} projection visit the six 5-cells that appear as six disjoint pentagrams in the {30/12}=6{5/2} projection. (Note: In triacontagram {30/12}=6{5/2}, six of the 120 disjoint regular 5-cells of edge-length √2.5 which are inscribed in the 120-cell appear as six pentagrams, the Clifford polygon of the 5-cell. The 30 vertices comprise a Petrie polygon of the 120-cell, (Note: In triacontagram {30/9}=3{10/3} we see the 120-cell Petrie polygon (on the circumference of the 30-gon, with 120-cell edges not shown) as a compound of three Clifford parallel 600-cell great decagons (seen as three disjoint {10/3} decagrams) that spiral around each other. The 600-cell edges (#3 chords) connect vertices which are 3 600-cell edges apart (on a great circle), and 9 120-cell edges apart (on a Petrie polygon). The three disjoint {10/3} great decagons of 600-cell edges delineate a single Boerdijk–Coxeter helix 30-tetrahedron ring of an inscribed 600-cell. The 120-cell and 600-cell both have 30-gon Petrie polygons. (Note: The regular skew 30-gon is the Petrie polygon of the 600-cell and its dual the 120-cell. The Petrie polygons of the 120-cell occur in the 600-cell as duals of the 30-cell Boerdijk–Coxeter helix rings (the Petrie polygons of the 600-cell): connecting their 30 tetrahedral cell centers together produces the Petrie polygons of the dual 120-cell, as noticed by Rolfdieter Frank (circa 2001). Thus he discovered that the vertex set of the 120-cell partitions into 20 non-intersecting Petrie polygons. This set of 20 disjoint Clifford parallel skew polygons is a discrete Hopf fibration of the 120-cell (just as their 20 dual 30-cell rings are a discrete fibration of the 600-cell).) They are two distinct skew 30-gon helices, composed of 30 120-cell edges (#1 chords) and 30 600-cell edges (#3 chords) respectively, but they occur in completely orthogonal pairs that spiral around the same 0-gon great circle axis. The 120-cell's Petrie helix winds closer to the axis than the 600-cell's Petrie helix does, because its 30 edges are shorter than the 600-cell's 30 edges (and they zig-zag at less acute angles). A dual pair of these Petrie helices of different radii sharing an axis do not have any vertices in common; they are completely disjoint. (Note: "At a point of contact, [elements of a regular polytope and elements of its dual in which it is inscribed in some manner] lie in completely orthogonal subspaces of the tangent hyperplane to the sphere [of reciprocation], so their only common point is the point of contact itself.... In fact, the [various] radii _{0}𝑹, _{1}𝑹, _{2}𝑹, ... determine the polytopes ... whose vertices are the centers of elements 𝐈𝐈_{0}, 𝐈𝐈_{1}, 𝐈𝐈_{2}, ... of the original polytope.") The 120-cell Petrie helix (versus the 600-cell Petrie helix) twists around the 0-gon axis 9 times (versus 11 times) in the course of one circular orbit, forming a skew {30/9}=3{10/3} polygram (versus a skew {30/11} polygram).) with 30 zig-zag edges (not shown), and 3 inscribed great decagons (edges not shown) which lie Clifford parallel to the projection plane. (Note: Inscribed in the 3 Clifford parallel great decagons of each helical Petrie polygon of the 120-cell are 6 great pentagons (Note: In 600-cell § Decagons and pentadecagrams, see the illustration of triacontagram {30/6}=6{5}.) in which the 6 pentagrams (regular 5-cells) appear to be inscribed, but the pentagrams are skew (not parallel to the projection plane); each 5-cell actually has vertices in 5 different decagon-pentagon central planes in 5 completely disjoint 600-cells.) Inscribed in the unit-radius 120-cell are 120 disjoint regular 5-cells, of edge-length √2.5. No regular 4-polytopes except the 5-cell and the 120-cell contain √2.5 chords (the #8 chord). (Note: Multiple instances of each of the regular convex 4-polytopes can be inscribed in any of their larger successor 4-polytopes, except for the smallest, the regular 5-cell, which occurs inscribed only in the largest, the 120-cell. (Note: There is a geometric relationship between the regular 5-cell (4-simplex) and the regular 16-cell (4-orthoplex), but it is manifest only indirectly through the 3-simplex and 5-orthoplex. An $n$-simplex is bounded by $n+1$ vertices and $n+1$ ($n$-1)-simplex facets, and has $n+1$ long diameters (its edges) of length $\sqrt{n+1}/\sqrt{n}$ radii. An $n$-orthoplex is bounded by $2n$ vertices and $2^n$ ($n$-1)-simplex facets, and has $n$ long diameters (its orthogonal axes) of length $2$ radii. An $n$-cube is bounded by $2^n$ vertices and $2n$ ($n$-1)-cube facets, and has $2^{n-1}$ long diameters of length $\sqrt{n}$ radii. (Note: The $n$-simplex's facets are larger than the $n$-orthoplex's facets. For $n=4$, the edge lengths of the 5-cell and 16-cell and 8-cell are in the ratio of $\sqrt{5}$ to $\sqrt{4}$ to $\sqrt{2}$.) The $\sqrt{3}$ long diameters of the 3-cube are shorter than the $\sqrt{4}$ axes of the 3-orthoplex. The coordinates of the 4-orthoplex are the permutations of $(0,0,0,\pm 1)$, and the 4-space coordinates of one of its 16 facets (a 3-simplex) are the permutations of $(0,0,0,1)$. (Note: Each 3-facet of the 4-orthoplex, a tetrahedron permuting $(0,0,0,1)$, and its completely orthogonal 3-facet permuting $(0,0,0,-1)$, comprise all 8 vertices of the 4-orthoplex. Uniquely, the 4-orthoplex is also the 4-demicube, half the vertices of the 4-cube. This relationship among the 4-simplex, 4-orthoplex and 4-cube is unique to $n=4$. The 4-orthoplex's completely orthogonal 3-simplex facets are a pair of 3-demicubes which occupy alternate vertices of completely orthogonal 3-cubes in the same 4-cube. Projected orthogonally into the same 3-hyperplane, the two 3-facets would be two tetrahedra inscribed in the same 3-cube. (More generally, completely orthogonal polytopes are mirror reflections of each other.)) The $\sqrt{4}$ long diameters of the 4-cube are the same length as the $\sqrt{4}$ axes of the 4-orthoplex. The coordinates of the 5-orthoplex are the permutations of $(0,0,0,0,\pm 1)$, and the 5-space coordinates of one of its 32 facets (a 4-simplex) are the permutations of $(0,0,0,0,1)$. (Note: Each 4-facet of the 5-orthoplex, a 4-simplex (5-cell) permuting $(0,0,0,0,1)$, and its completely orthogonal 4-facet permuting $(0,0,0,0,-1)$, comprise all 10 vertices of the 5-orthoplex.) The $\sqrt{5}$ long diameters of the 5-cube are longer than the $\sqrt{4}$ axes of the 5-orthoplex.) To understand the way in which the 4-polytopes nest within each other, it is necessary to carefully distinguish disjoint multiple instances from merely distinct multiple instances of inscribed 4-polytopes. For example, the 600-point 120-cell is the convex hull of a compound of 75 8-point 16-cells that are completely disjoint: they share no vertices, and 75 * 8 = 600. But it is also possible to pick out 675 distinct 16-cells within the 120-cell, most pairs of which share some vertices, because two concentric equal-radius 16-cells may be rotated with respect to each other such that they share 2 vertices (an axis), or even 4 vertices (a great square plane), while their remaining vertices are not coincident. (Note: The 120-cell has 600 vertices distributed symmetrically on the surface of a 3-sphere in four-dimensional Euclidean space. The vertices come in antipodal pairs, and the lines through antipodal pairs of vertices define the 300 rays [or axes] of the 120-cell. We will term any set of four mutually orthogonal rays (or directions) a basis. The 300 rays form 675 bases, with each ray occurring in 9 bases and being orthogonal to its 27 distinct companions in these bases and to no other rays. The rays and bases constitute a geometric configuration, which in the language of configurations is written as 300_{9}675_{4} to indicate that each ray belongs to 9 bases, and each basis contains 4 rays. Each basis corresponds to a distinct 16-cell containing four orthogonal axes and six orthogonal great squares. 75 completely disjoint 16-cells containing all 600 vertices of the 120-cell can be selected from the 675 distinct 16-cells.) In 4-space, any two congruent regular 4-polytopes may be concentric but rotated with respect to each other such that they share only a common subset of their vertices. Only in the case of the 4-simplex (the 5-point regular 5-cell) that common subset of vertices must always be empty, unless it is all 5 vertices. It is impossible to rotate two concentric 4-simplexes with respect to each other such that some, but not all, of their vertices are coincident: they may only be completely coincident, or completely disjoint. Only the 4-simplex has this property; the 16-cell, and by extension any larger regular 4-polytope, may lie rotated with respect to itself such that the pair shares some, but not all, of their vertices. Intuitively we may see how this follows from the fact that only the 4-simplex does not possess any opposing vertices (any 2-vertex central axes) which might be invariant after a rotation. The 120-cell contains 120 completely disjoint regular 5-cells, which are its only distinct inscribed regular 5-cells, but every other nesting of regular 4-polytopes features some number of disjoint inscribed 4-polytopes and a larger number of distinct inscribed 4-polytopes.) The 120-cell contains 10 distinct inscribed 600-cells which can be taken as 5 disjoint 600-cells two different ways. Each √2.5 chord connects two vertices in disjoint 600-cells, and hence in disjoint 24-cells, 8-cells, and 16-cells. Both the 5-cell edges and the 120-cell edges connect vertices in disjoint 600-cells. Corresponding polytopes of the same kind in disjoint 600-cells are Clifford parallel and √2.5 apart. Each 5-cell contains one vertex from each of 5 disjoint 600-cells. (Note: The 120 regular 5-cells are completely disjoint. Each 5-cell contains two distinct Petrie pentagons of its #8 edges, pentagonal circuits each binding 5 disjoint 600-cells together in a distinct isoclinic rotation characteristic of the 5-cell. But the vertices of two disjoint 5-cells are not linked by 5-cell edges, so each distinct circuit of #8 chords is confined to a single 5-cell, and there are no other circuits of 5-cell edges (#8 chords) in the 120-cell.))) The skew chord set of an isocline is called its Clifford polygon. (Note: The chord-path of an isocline may be called the 4-polytope's Clifford polygon, as it is the skew polygram shape of the rotational circles traversed by the 4-polytope's vertices in its characteristic Clifford displacement.)) the edges do not form regular great circles, they form irregular great circles in combination with another chord. For example, the #1 chord edges of the 120-cell are edges of an irregular great dodecagon which also has #4 chord edges. In such a 4-polytope, the rotation angle is not the edge arc-angle; in fact it is not necessarily the arc of any vertex chord.) In each incremental rotation step from vertex to neighboring vertex, each invariant rotation plane rotates by the rotation angle, and also tilts sideways (like a coin flipping) by an equal rotation angle. (Note: In an isoclinic rotation each invariant plane is Clifford parallel to the plane it moves to, and they do not intersect at any time (except at the central point). In a simple rotation the invariant plane intersects the plane it moves to in a line, and moves to it by rotating around that line.) Thus each vertex rotates on a great circle by one rotation angle increment, while simultaneously the whole great circle rotates with the completely orthogonal great circle by an equal rotation angle increment. (Note: It is easiest to visualize this incorrectly, because the completely orthogonal great circles are Clifford parallel and do not intersect (except at the central point). Neither do the invariant plane and the plane it moves to. An invariant plane tilts sideways in an orthogonal central plane which is not its completely orthogonal plane, but Clifford parallel to it. It rotates with its completely orthogonal plane, but not in it. It is Clifford parallel to its completely orthogonal plane and to the plane it is moving to, and does not intersect them; the plane that it rotates in is orthogonal to all these planes and intersects them all. (Note: The plane in which an entire invariant plane rotates (tilts sideways) is (incompletely) orthogonal to both completely orthogonal invariant planes, and also Clifford parallel to both of them. (Note: Although perpendicular and linked (like adjacent links in a taught chain), completely orthogonal great polygons are also parallel, and lie exactly opposite each other in the 4-polytope, in planes that do not intersect except at one point, the common center of the two linked circles.)) In the 120-cell's characteristic rotation, each invariant rotation plane is Clifford parallel to its completely orthogonal plane, but not adjacent to it; it reaches some other (nearest) parallel plane first. But if the isoclinic rotation taking it through successive Clifford parallel planes is continued through 90°, the vertices will have moved 180° and the tilting rotation plane will reach its (original) completely orthogonal plane. (Note: The 90 degree isoclinic rotation of two completely orthogonal planes takes them to each other. In such a rotation of a rigid 4-polytope, all 6 orthogonal planes rotate by 90 degrees, and also tilt sideways by 90 degrees to their completely orthogonal (Clifford parallel) plane. The corresponding vertices of the two completely orthogonal great polygons are √4 (180°) apart; the great polygons (Clifford parallel polytopes) are √4 (180°) apart; but the two completely orthogonal planes are 90° apart, in the two orthogonal angles that separate them. If the isoclinic rotation is continued through another 90°, each vertex completes a 360° rotation and each great polygon returns to its original plane, but in a different orientation (axes swapped): it has been turned "upside down" on the surface of the 4-polytope (which is now "inside out"). Continuing through a second 360° isoclinic rotation (through four 90° by 90° isoclinic steps, a 720° rotation) returns everything to its original place and orientation.)) The product of these two simultaneous and equal great circle rotation increments is an overall displacement of each vertex by the isocline angle increment (the isocline chord length). Thus the rotation angle measures the vertex displacement in the reference frame of a moving great circle, and also the sideways displacement of the moving great circle (the distance between the great circle polygon and the adjacent Clifford parallel great circle polygon the rotation takes it to) in the stationary reference frame. The isocline chord length is the total vertex displacement in the stationary reference frame, which is an oblique chord between the two great circle polygons (the distance between their corresponding vertices in the rotation).) is a double rotation (in two completely orthogonal invariant central planes at once), in each incremental rotation step from vertex to neighboring vertex the vertices travel between central planes on helical great circle isoclines, not on ordinary great circles, over an isocline chord which in this particular rotation is a #4 chord of 44.5~° arc-length. (Note: The isocline chord of the 120-cell's characteristic rotation is the #4 chord of 44.5~° arc-angle (the larger edge of the irregular great dodecagon), because in that isoclinic rotation by two equal 12° rotation angles each vertex moves to another vertex 4 edge-lengths away on a Petrie polygon, and the circular geodesic path it rotates on (its isocline) does not intersect any nearer vertices.)) joining vertices which are 8 vertices apart on the 30-vertex circumference of this projection, the zig-zag Petrie polygon. The characteristic isoclinic rotation of the 120-cell takes place in the invariant planes of its 1200 edges and its inscribed regular 5-cells' opposing 1200 edges. (Note: The invariant central plane of the 120-cell's characteristic isoclinic rotation contains an irregular great hexagon {6} with alternating edges of two different lengths: 3 120-cell edges of length 𝜁 = √𝜀 (#1 chords), and 3 inscribed regular 5-cell edges of length √2.5 (#8 chords). These are, respectively, the shortest and longest edges of any regular 4-polytope. (Note: Each √2.5 chord is spanned by 8 zig-zag edges of a Petrie 30-gon, (Note: The Petrie polygon of the 120-cell is a skew regular triacontagon {30}. (Note: The 30-edge circumference of the 120-cell follows a skew Petrie polygon, not a great circle polygon. The Petrie polygon of any 4-polytope is a zig-zag helix spiraling through the curved 3-space of the 4-polytope's surface. (Note: The Petrie polygon of a 3-polytope (polyhedron) with triangular faces (e.g. an icosahedron) can be seen as a linear strip of edge-bonded faces bent into a ring. Within that circular strip of edge-bonded triangles (10 in the case of the icosahedron) the Petrie polygon can be picked out as a skew polygon of edges zig-zagging (not circling) through the 2-space of the polyhedron's surface: alternately bending left and right, and slaloming around a great circle axis that passes through the triangles but does not intersect any vertices. The Petrie polygon of a 4-polytope (polychoron) with tetrahedral cells (e.g. a 600-cell) can be seen as a linear helix of face-bonded cells bent into a ring: a Boerdijk–Coxeter helix ring. Within that circular helix of face-bonded tetrahedra (30 in the case of the 600-cell) the skew Petrie polygon can be picked out as a helix of edges zig-zagging (not circling) through the 3-space of the polychoron's surface: alternately bending left and right, and spiraling around a great circle axis that passes through the tetrahedra but does not intersect any vertices.) The 15 numbered chords of the 120-cell occur as the distance between two vertices in that 30-vertex helical ring. (Note: The 120-cell itself contains more chords than the 15 chords numbered #1 - #15, but the additional chords occur only in the interior of 120-cell, not as edges of any of the six regular convex 4-polytopes or their characteristic great circle rings. The 15 major chords are so numbered because the #n chord connects two vertices which are n edge lengths apart on a Petrie polygon of the 120-cell. The 15 major chords lie on great circles in central planes that contain regular and irregular polygons of {4}, {10}, or {12} vertices. There are 30 distinct 4-space chordal distances between vertices of the 120-cell (15 pairs of 180° complements), including #15 the 180° diameter (and its complement the 0° chord). The 15 minor chords lie on rectangular {4} great circles and do not occur anywhere except inside the 120-cell. In this article, we name the 15 unnumbered minor chords by their arc-angles, e.g. 41.4~° which, with length √0.5, falls between the #3~4 chords.) Those 15 distinct Pythagorean distances through 4-space range from the 120-cell edge-length which links any two nearest vertices in the ring (the #1 chord), to the 120-cell axis-length (diameter) which links any two antipodal (most distant) vertices in the ring (the #15 chord).) The 30 #1 chord edges do not all lie on the same {30} great circle polygon, but they lie in groups of 6 (equally spaced around the circumference) in 5 Clifford parallel {12} great circle polygons. The 120-cell contains 80 distinct 30-gon Petrie polygons of its 1200 edges, and can be partitioned into 20 disjoint 30-gon Petrie polygons. The Petrie 30-gon twists around its 0-gon great circle axis 9 times in the course of one circular orbit, and can be seen as a compound triacontagram {30/9}=3{10/3} of 600-cell edges (#3 chords) linking pairs of vertices that are 9 vertices apart on the Petrie polygon. The {30/9}-gram (with its #3 chord edges) is an alternate sequence of the same 30 vertices as the Petrie 30-gon (with its #1 chord edges).) none of which lie in the great circle of the irregular great hexagon. Alternately the √2.5 chord is spanned by 9 zig-zag edges, one of which (over its midpoint) does lie in the same great circle.) Each irregular great hexagon lies completely orthogonal to another irregular great hexagon. The 120-cell contains 400 distinct irregular great hexagons (200 completely orthogonal pairs), which can be partitioned into 100 disjoint irregular great hexagons (a discrete fibration of the 120-cell) in four different ways. Each fibration has its distinct left (and right) isoclinic rotation in 50 pairs of completely orthogonal invariant central planes. Two irregular great hexagons occupy the same central plane, in alternate positions, just as two great pentagons occupy a great decagon plane. The two irregular great hexagons form an irregular great dodecagon, a compound great circle polygon of the 120-cell.) There are four distinct characteristic right (and left) isoclinic rotations, each left-right pair corresponding to a discrete Hopf fibration. In each rotation all 600 vertices circulate on helical isoclines of 15 vertices, following a geodesic circle with 15 chords that form a {15/4} pentadecagram.) and {30}.) As the sixth and largest regular convex 4-polytope, (Note: The convex regular 4-polytopes can be ordered by size as a measure of 4-dimensional content (hypervolume) for the same radius. Each greater polytope in the sequence is rounder than its predecessor, enclosing more 4-content within the same radius. The 4-simplex (5-cell) is the limit smallest case, and the 120-cell is the largest. Complexity (as measured by comparing configuration matrices or simply the number of vertices) follows the same ordering. This provides an alternative numerical naming scheme for regular polytopes in which the 120-cell is the 600-point 4-polytope: sixth and last in the ascending sequence that begins with the 5-point 4-polytope.) it contains inscribed instances of its four predecessors (recursively). It also contains 120 inscribed instances of the first in the sequence, the 5-cell, which is not found in any of the others.

The 120-cell contains examples of every relationship among all the convex regular polytopes found in the first four dimensions. Conversely, it can only be understood by first understanding each of its predecessors, and the sequence of increasingly complex symmetries they exhibit. That is why Stillwell titled his paper on the 4-polytopes and the history of mathematics of more than 3 dimensions The Story of the 120-cell.

Regular convex 4-polytopes
Symmetry group	A_{4}	B_{4}		F_{4}	H_{4}	
Name	5-cell Hyper-tetrahedron; 5-point	16-cell Hyper-octahedron; 8-point	8-cell Hyper-cube; 16-point	24-cell 24-point	600-cell Hyper-icosahedron; 120-point	120-cell Hyper-dodecahedron; 600-point
Schläfli symbol	{3, 3, 3}	{3, 3, 4}	{4, 3, 3}	{3, 4, 3}	{3, 3, 5}	{5, 3, 3}
Coxeter mirrors						
Mirror dihedrals	𝝅/3 𝝅/3 𝝅/3 𝝅/2 𝝅/2 𝝅/2	𝝅/3 𝝅/3 𝝅/4 𝝅/2 𝝅/2 𝝅/2	𝝅/4 𝝅/3 𝝅/3 𝝅/2 𝝅/2 𝝅/2	𝝅/3 𝝅/4 𝝅/3 𝝅/2 𝝅/2 𝝅/2	𝝅/3 𝝅/3 𝝅/5 𝝅/2 𝝅/2 𝝅/2	𝝅/5 𝝅/3 𝝅/3 𝝅/2 𝝅/2 𝝅/2
Graph						
Vertices	5 tetrahedral	8 octahedral	16 tetrahedral	24 cubical	120 icosahedral	600 tetrahedral
Edges	10 triangular	24 square	32 triangular	96 triangular	720 pentagonal	1200 triangular
Faces	10 triangles	32 triangles	24 squares	96 triangles	1200 triangles	720 pentagons
Cells	5 tetrahedra	16 tetrahedra	8 cubes	24 octahedra	600 tetrahedra	120 dodecahedra
Tori	1 5-tetrahedron	2 8-tetrahedron	2 4-cube	4 6-octahedron	20 30-tetrahedron	12 10-dodecahedron
Inscribed	120 in 120-cell	675 in 120-cell	2 16-cells	3 8-cells	25 24-cells	10 600-cells
Great polygons		2 squares x 3	4 rectangles x 4	4 hexagons x 4	12 decagons x 6	100 irregular hexagons x 4
Petrie polygons	1 pentagon x 2	1 octagon x 3	2 octagons x 4	2 dodecagons x 4	4 30-gons x 6	20 30-gons x 4
Long radius	$1$	$1$	$1$	$1$	$1$	$1$
Edge length	$\sqrt{\tfrac{5}{2}} \approx 1.581$	$\sqrt{2} \approx 1.414$	$1$	$1$	$\tfrac{1}{\phi} \approx 0.618$	$\tfrac{1}{\phi^2\sqrt{2}} \approx 0.270$
Short radius	$\tfrac{1}{4}$	$\tfrac{1}{2}$	$\tfrac{1}{2}$	$\sqrt{\tfrac{1}{2}} \approx 0.707$	$\sqrt{\tfrac{\phi^4}{8}} \approx 0.926$	$\sqrt{\tfrac{\phi^4}{8}} \approx 0.926$
Area	$10\left(\tfrac{5\sqrt{3}}{8}\right) \approx 10.825$	$32\left(\sqrt{\tfrac{3}{4}}\right) \approx 27.713$	$24$	$96\left(\sqrt{\tfrac{3}{16}}\right) \approx 41.569$	$1200\left(\tfrac{\sqrt{3}}{4\phi^2}\right) \approx 198.48$	$720\left(\tfrac{\sqrt{25+10\sqrt{5}}}{8\phi^4}\right) \approx 90.366$
Volume	$5\left(\tfrac{5\sqrt{5}}{24}\right) \approx 2.329$	$16\left(\tfrac{1}{3}\right) \approx 5.333$	$8$	$24\left(\tfrac{\sqrt{2}}{3}\right) \approx 11.314$	$600\left(\tfrac{\sqrt{2}}{12\phi^3}\right) \approx 16.693$	$120\left(\tfrac{15 + 7\sqrt{5}}{4\phi^6\sqrt{8}}\right) \approx 18.118$
4-Content	$\tfrac{\sqrt{5}}{24}\left(\tfrac{\sqrt{5}}{2}\right)^4 \approx 0.146$	$\tfrac{2}{3} \approx 0.667$	$1$	$2$	$\tfrac{\text{Short}\times\text{Vol}}{4} \approx 3.863$	$\tfrac{\text{Short}\times\text{Vol}}{4} \approx 4.193$

=== Cartesian coordinates ===
Natural Cartesian coordinates for a 4-polytope centered at the origin of 4-space occur in different frames of reference, depending on the long radius (center-to-vertex) chosen.

==== √8 radius coordinates ====
The 120-cell with long radius √8 = 2√2 ≈ 2.828 has edge length 4−2φ = 3−√5 ≈ 0.764.

In this frame of reference, its 600 vertex coordinates are the {permutations} and [even permutations] of the following:

24	({0, 0, ±2, ±2})	24-cell	600-point 120-cell
64	({±φ, ±φ, ±φ, ±φ^{−2}})		600-point 120-cell
64	({±1, ±1, ±1, ±√5})		600-point 120-cell
64	({±φ^{−1}, ±φ^{−1}, ±φ^{−1}, ±φ^{2}})		600-point 120-cell
96	([0, ±φ^{−1}, ±φ, ±√5])	Snub 24-cell	600-point 120-cell
96	([0, ±φ^{−2}, ±1, ±φ^{2}])	Snub 24-cell	600-point 120-cell
192	([±φ^{−1}, ±1, ±φ, ±2])		600-point 120-cell

where φ (also called 𝝉) (Note: (Coxeter 1973) uses the greek letter 𝝓 (phi) to represent one of the three characteristic angles 𝟀, 𝝓, 𝟁 of a regular polytope. Because 𝝓 is commonly used to represent the golden ratio constant ≈ 1.618, for which Coxeter uses 𝝉 (tau), we reverse Coxeter's conventions, and use 𝝉 to represent the characteristic angle.) is the golden ratio, (1 + √5)/2 ≈ 1.618.

==== Unit radius coordinates ====
The unit-radius 120-cell has edge length 1/φ^{2}√2 ≈ 0.270.

In this frame of reference the 120-cell lies vertex up in standard orientation, and its coordinates are the {permutations} and [even permutations] in the left column below:

120	8	({±1, 0, 0, 0})	16-cell	24-cell	600-cell	120-cell
120	16	({±1, ±1, ±1, ±1}) / 2	Tesseract	24-cell	600-cell	120-cell
120	96	([0, ±φ^{−1}, ±1, ±φ]) / 2	Snub 24-cell		600-cell	120-cell
480	Diminished 120-cell		5-point 5-cell	24-cell	600-cell	120-cell
480	32	([±φ, ±φ, ±φ, ±φ^{−2}]) / √8	(1, 0, 0, 0) (−1, √5, √5, √5) / 4 (−1,−√5,−√5, √5) / 4 (−1,−√5, √5,−√5) / 4 (−1, √5,−√5,−√5) / 4	({±√1/2, ±√1/2, 0, 0})	({±1, 0, 0, 0}) ({±1, ±1, ±1, ±1}) / 2 ([0, ±φ^{−1}, ±1, ±φ]) / 2	120-cell
480	32	([±1, ±1, ±1, ±√5]) / √8	(1, 0, 0, 0) (−1, √5, √5, √5) / 4 (−1,−√5,−√5, √5) / 4 (−1,−√5, √5,−√5) / 4 (−1, √5,−√5,−√5) / 4	({±√1/2, ±√1/2, 0, 0})	({±1, 0, 0, 0}) ({±1, ±1, ±1, ±1}) / 2 ([0, ±φ^{−1}, ±1, ±φ]) / 2	120-cell
480	32	([±φ^{−1}, ±φ^{−1}, ±φ^{−1}, ±φ^{2}]) / √8	(1, 0, 0, 0) (−1, √5, √5, √5) / 4 (−1,−√5,−√5, √5) / 4 (−1,−√5, √5,−√5) / 4 (−1, √5,−√5,−√5) / 4	({±√1/2, ±√1/2, 0, 0})	({±1, 0, 0, 0}) ({±1, ±1, ±1, ±1}) / 2 ([0, ±φ^{−1}, ±1, ±φ]) / 2	120-cell
480	96	([0, ±φ^{−1}, ±φ, ±√5]) / √8	(1, 0, 0, 0) (−1, √5, √5, √5) / 4 (−1,−√5,−√5, √5) / 4 (−1,−√5, √5,−√5) / 4 (−1, √5,−√5,−√5) / 4	({±√1/2, ±√1/2, 0, 0})	({±1, 0, 0, 0}) ({±1, ±1, ±1, ±1}) / 2 ([0, ±φ^{−1}, ±1, ±φ]) / 2	120-cell
480	96	([0, ±φ^{−2}, ±1, ±φ^{2}]) / √8	(1, 0, 0, 0) (−1, √5, √5, √5) / 4 (−1,−√5,−√5, √5) / 4 (−1,−√5, √5,−√5) / 4 (−1, √5,−√5,−√5) / 4	({±√1/2, ±√1/2, 0, 0})	({±1, 0, 0, 0}) ({±1, ±1, ±1, ±1}) / 2 ([0, ±φ^{−1}, ±1, ±φ]) / 2	120-cell
480	192	([±φ^{−1}, ±1, ±φ, ±2]) / √8	(1, 0, 0, 0) (−1, √5, √5, √5) / 4 (−1,−√5,−√5, √5) / 4 (−1,−√5, √5,−√5) / 4 (−1, √5,−√5,−√5) / 4	({±√1/2, ±√1/2, 0, 0})	({±1, 0, 0, 0}) ({±1, ±1, ±1, ±1}) / 2 ([0, ±φ^{−1}, ±1, ±φ]) / 2	120-cell
The unit-radius coordinates of uniform convex 4-polytopes are related by quaternion multiplication. Since the regular 4-polytopes are compounds of each other, their sets of Cartesian 4-coordinates (quaternions) are set products of each other. The unit-radius coordinates of the 600 vertices of the 120-cell (in the left column above) are all the possible quaternion products of the 5 vertices of the 5-cell, the 24 vertices of the 24-cell, and the 120 vertices of the 600-cell (in the other three columns above). (Note: To obtain all 600 coordinates by quaternion cross-multiplication of these three 4-polytopes' coordinates with less redundancy, it is sufficient to include just one vertex of the 24-cell: (√1/2, √1/2, 0, 0).)

The table gives the coordinates of at least one instance of each 4-polytope, but the 120-cell contains multiples-of-five inscribed instances of each of its precursor 4-polytopes, occupying different subsets of its vertices. The (600-point) 120-cell is the convex hull of 5 disjoint (120-point) 600-cells. Each (120-point) 600-cell is the convex hull of 5 disjoint (24-point) 24-cells, so the 120-cell is the convex hull of 25 disjoint 24-cells. Each 24-cell is the convex hull of 3 disjoint (8-point) 16-cells, so the 120-cell is the convex hull of 75 disjoint 16-cells. Uniquely, the (600-point) 120-cell is the convex hull of 120 disjoint (5-point) 5-cells. (Note: The 120-cell can be constructed as a compound of 5 disjoint 600-cells, (Note: The 600 vertices of the 120-cell can be partitioned into those of 5 disjoint inscribed 120-vertex 600-cells in two different ways. The geometry of this 4D partitioning is dimensionally analogous to the 3D partitioning of the 20 vertices of the dodecahedron into 5 disjoint inscribed tetrahedra, which can also be done in two different ways because each dodecahedral cell contains two opposing sets of 5 disjoint inscribed tetrahedral cells. The 120-cell can be partitioned in a manner analogous to the dodecahedron because each of its dodecahedral cells contains one tetrahedral cell from each of the 10 inscribed 600-cells.) or 25 disjoint 24-cells, or 75 disjoint 16-cells, or 120 disjoint 5-cells. Except in the case of the 120 5-cells, these are not counts of all the distinct regular 4-polytopes which can be found inscribed in the 120-cell, only the counts of completely disjoint inscribed 4-polytopes which when compounded form the convex hull of the 120-cell. The 120-cell contains 10 distinct 600-cells, 225 distinct 24-cells, and 675 distinct 16-cells.)

=== Chords ===
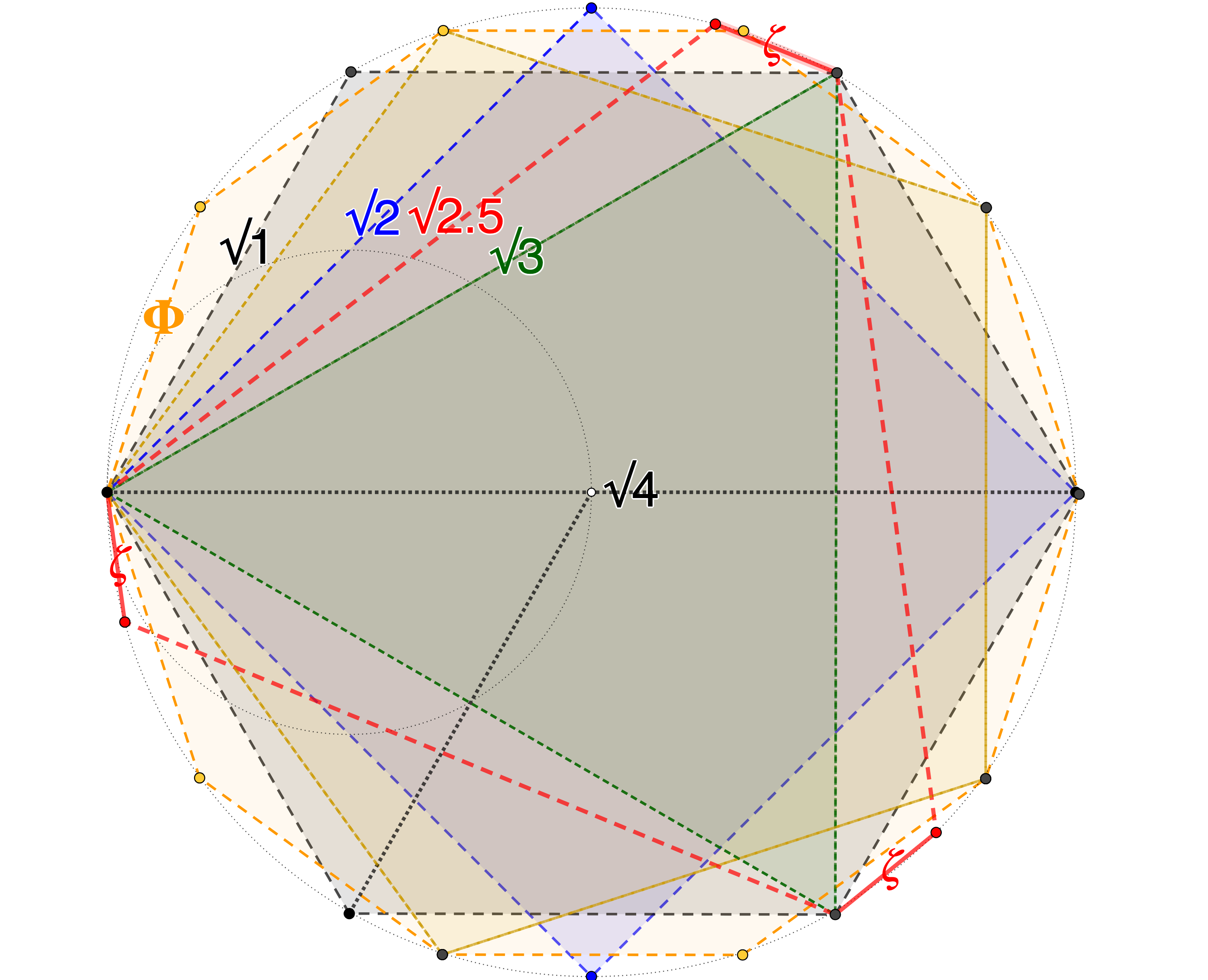
Great circle polygons of the 120-cell, which lie in the invariant central planes of its isoclinic rotations. The 120-cell edges of length 𝜁 ≈ 0.270 occur only in the red irregular great hexagon, which also has 5-cell edges of length √2.5. The 120-cell's 1200 edges do not form great circle polygons by themselves, but by alternating with √2.5 edges of inscribed regular 5-cells they form 400 irregular great hexagons. The 120-cell also contains an irregular great dodecagon compound of several of these great circle polygons in the same central plane, illustrated below.

The 600-point 120-cell has all 8 of the 120-point 600-cell's distinct chord lengths, plus two additional important chords: its own shorter edges, and the edges of its 120 inscribed regular 5-cells. These two additional chords give the 120-cell its characteristic isoclinic rotation, in addition to all the rotations of the other regular 4-polytopes which it inherits. They also give the 120-cell a characteristic great circle polygon: an irregular great hexagon in which three 120-cell edges alternate with three 5-cell edges.

The 120-cell's edges do not form regular great circle polygons in a single central plane the way the edges of the 600-cell, 24-cell, and 16-cell do. Like the edges of the 5-cell and the 8-cell tesseract, they form zig-zag Petrie polygons instead. The 120-cell's Petrie polygon is a triacontagon {30} zig-zag skew polygon.

Since the 120-cell has a circumference of 30 edges, it has at least 15 distinct chord lengths, ranging from its edge length to its diameter. Every regular convex 4-polytope is inscribed in the 120-cell, and the 15 chords enumerated in the rows of the following table are all the distinct chords that make up the regular 4-polytopes and their great circle polygons.

The first thing to notice about this table is that it has eight columns, not six; in addition to the six regular convex 4-polytopes, two irregular 4-polytopes occur naturally in the sequence of nested 4-polytopes: the 96-point snub 24-cell and the 480-point diminished 120-cell.

The second thing to notice is that each numbered row (each chord) is marked with a triangle △, square ☐, phi symbol 𝜙 or pentagram ✩. The 15 chords form polygons of four kinds: great squares ☐ characteristic of the 16-cell, great hexagons and great triangles △ characteristic of the 24-cell, great decagons and great pentagons 𝜙 characteristic of the 600-cell, and skew pentagrams ✩ characteristic of the 5-cell which circle through a set of central planes and form face polygons but not great polygons. (Note: The √2 edges and 4𝝅 characteristic rotations of the 16-cell lie in the great square ☐ central planes; rotations of this type are an expression of the symmetry group $B_4$. The √1 edges, √3 chords and 4𝝅 characteristic rotations of the 24-cell lie in the great triangle (great hexagon) △ central planes; rotations of this type are an expression of the $F_4$ symmetry group. The edges and 5𝝅 characteristic rotations of the 600-cell lie in the great pentagon (great decagon) 𝜙 central planes; these chords are functions of √5, and rotations of this type are an expression of the symmetry group $H_4$. The polygons and characteristic rotations of the regular 5-cell do not lie in a single central plane; they describe a skew pentagram ✩ or larger skew polygram and only form face polygons, not central polygons; rotations of this type are expressions of the $A_4$ symmetry group.)

Major chords of the 120-cell and its inscribed 4-polytopes
Inscribed						5-cell	16-cell	8-cell	24-cell	Snub	600-cell	Dimin	120-cell	
Vertices						5	8	16	24	96	120	480	600	
Edges						10	24	32	96	432	720	1200	1200	
Edge chord						#8	#7	#5	#5	#3	#3	#1	#1	
Isocline chord						#8	#15	#10	#10	#5	#5	#4	#4	
Clifford polygon						{5/2}	{8/3}		{6/2}		{15/2}		{15/4}	
Chord			Arc	Edge										
#1 △	{30}	30		120-cell edge									1; 1200	4 {3,3}
#1 △	{30}	30	15.5~°	√𝜀 (Note: The fractional square root chord lengths are given as decimal fractions where: 𝚽 ≈ 0.618 is the inverse golden ratio 1/φ 𝚫 = 1 - 𝚽 = 𝚽^{2} = 1/φ^{2} ≈ 0.382 𝜀 = 𝚫^{2}/2 = 1/2φ^{4} ≈ 0.073 and the 120-cell edge-length is: 𝛇 = √𝜀 = 1/φ^{2}√2 ≈ 0.270 For example: 𝛇 = √𝜀 = √0.073~ ≈ 0.270)	0.270~								1; 1200	4 {3,3}
#2 ☐	{30/2}=2{15}	15		face diagonal (Note: The #2 chord joins vertices which are 2 edge lengths apart: the vertices of the 120-cell's tetrahedral vertex figure, the second section of the 120-cell beginning with a vertex, denoted 1_{0}. The #2 chords are the edges of this tetrahedron, and the #1 chords are its long radii. The #2 chords are also diagonal chords of the 120-cell's pentagon faces. (Note: The face pentagon diagonal (the #2 chord) is in the golden ratio φ ≈ 1.618 to the face pentagon edge (the 120-cell edge, the #1 chord). (Note: In the dodecahedral cell of the unit-radius 120-cell, the length of the edge (the #1 chord of the 120-cell) is 1/φ^{2}√2 ≈ 0.270. Eight orange vertices lie at the Cartesian coordinates (±φ^{3}√8, ±φ^{3}√8, ±φ^{3}√8) relative to origin at the cell center. They form a cube (dashed lines) of edge length 1/φ√2 ≈ 0.437 (the pentagon diagonal, and the #2 chord of the 120-cell). The face diagonals of the cube (not shown) of edge length 1/φ ≈ 0.618 are the edges of tetrahedral cells inscribed in the cube (600-cell edges, and the #3 chord of the 120-cell). The diameter of the dodecahedron is √3/φ√2 ≈ 0.757 (the cube diagonal, and the #4 chord of the 120-cell).)))									3600	12; 2{3,4}
#2 ☐	{30/2}=2{15}	15	25.2~°	√0.19~	0.437~								3600	12; 2{3,4}
#3 𝜙	{30/3}=3{10}	10	𝝅/5	great decagon $\phi^{-1}$							10; 720		7200	24; 2{3,5}
#3 𝜙	{30/3}=3{10}	10	36°	√0.𝚫	0.618~						10; 720		7200	24; 2{3,5}
#4 △	{30/4}=2{15/2}	15/2		cell diameter									1200	4 {3,3}
#4 △	{30/4}=2{15/2}	15/2	44.5~°	√0.57~	0.757~								1200	4 {3,3}
#5 △	{30/5}=5{6}	6	𝝅/3	great hexagon (Note: Triacontagram {30/5}=5{6}, the 120-cell's skew Petrie 30-gon as a compound of 5 great hexagons. Each great hexagon edge is the axis of a zig-zag of 5 120-cell edges. The 120-cell's Petrie polygon is a helical zig-zag of 30 120-cell edges, spiraling around a 0-gon great circle axis that does not intersect any vertices. There are 5 great hexagons inscribed in each Petrie polygon, in five different central planes.)				32	225; 96	225	5; 1200		2400	32; 4{4,3}
#5 △	{30/5}=5{6}	6	60°	√1	1			32	225; 96	225	5; 1200		2400	32; 4{4,3}
#6 𝜙	{30/6}=6{5}	5	2𝝅/5	great pentagon							720		7200	24; 2{3,5}
#6 𝜙	{30/6}=6{5}	5	72°	√1.𝚫	1.175~						720		7200	24; 2{3,5}
#7 ☐	{30/7}	30/7	𝝅/2	great square			675; 24	675; 48	72		1800		9000	54; 9{3,4}
#7 ☐	{30/7}	30/7	90°	√2	1.414~		675; 24	675; 48	72		1800		9000	54; 9{3,4}
#8 ✩	{30/8}=2{15/4}	15/4		5-cell edge		120; 10						720	1200	4 {3,3}
#8 ✩	{30/8}=2{15/4}	15/4	104.5~°	√2.5	1.581~	120; 10						720	1200	4 {3,3}
#9 𝜙	{30/9}=3{10/3}	10/3	3𝝅/5	golden section $\phi$							720		7200	24; 2{3,5}
#9 𝜙	{30/9}=3{10/3}	10/3	108°	√2.𝚽	1.618~						720		7200	24; 2{3,5}
#10 △	{30/10}=10{3}	3	2𝝅/3	great triangle				32	25; 96		1200		2400	32; 4{4,3}
#10 △	{30/10}=10{3}	3	120°	√3	1.732~			32	25; 96		1200		2400	32; 4{4,3}
#11 ✩	{30/11}	30/11		{30/11}-gram									1200	4 {3,3}
#11 ✩	{30/11}	30/11	135.5~°	√3.43~	1.851~								1200	4 {3,3}
#12 𝜙	{30/12}=6{5/2}	5/2	4𝝅/5	great pent diag (Note: The Petrie polygon of the 5-cell is the pentagram {5/2}. The Petrie polygon of the 120-cell is the triacontagon {30}, and one of its many projections to the plane is the triacontagram {30/12}=6{5/2}. Each 120-cell Petrie 6{5/2}-gram lies completely orthogonal to six 5-cell Petrie {5/2}-grams, which belong to six of the 120 disjoint regular 5-cells inscribed in the 120-cell.)							720		7200	24; 2{3,5}
#12 𝜙	{30/12}=6{5/2}	5/2	144°	√3.𝚽	1.902~						720		7200	24; 2{3,5}
#13 ✩	{30/13}	30/13		{30/13}-gram									3600	12; 2{3,4}
#13 ✩	{30/13}	30/13	154.8~°	√3.81~	1.952~								3600	12; 2{3,4}
#14 △	{30/14}=2{15/7}	15/7		{30/14}=2{15/7}									1200	4 {3,3}
#14 △	{30/14}=2{15/7}	15/7	164.5~°	√3.93~	1.982~								1200	4 {3,3}
#15 △☐𝜙	30/15}=15{2}	2	𝝅	diameter			75; 4	8	12	48	60	240	300	1
#15 △☐𝜙	30/15}=15{2}	2	180°	√4	2		75; 4	8	12	48	60	240	300	1
Squared lengths total (Note: The sum of the squared lengths of all the distinct chords of any regular convex n-polytope of unit radius is the square of the number of vertices.)						25	64	256	576		14400		360000	300

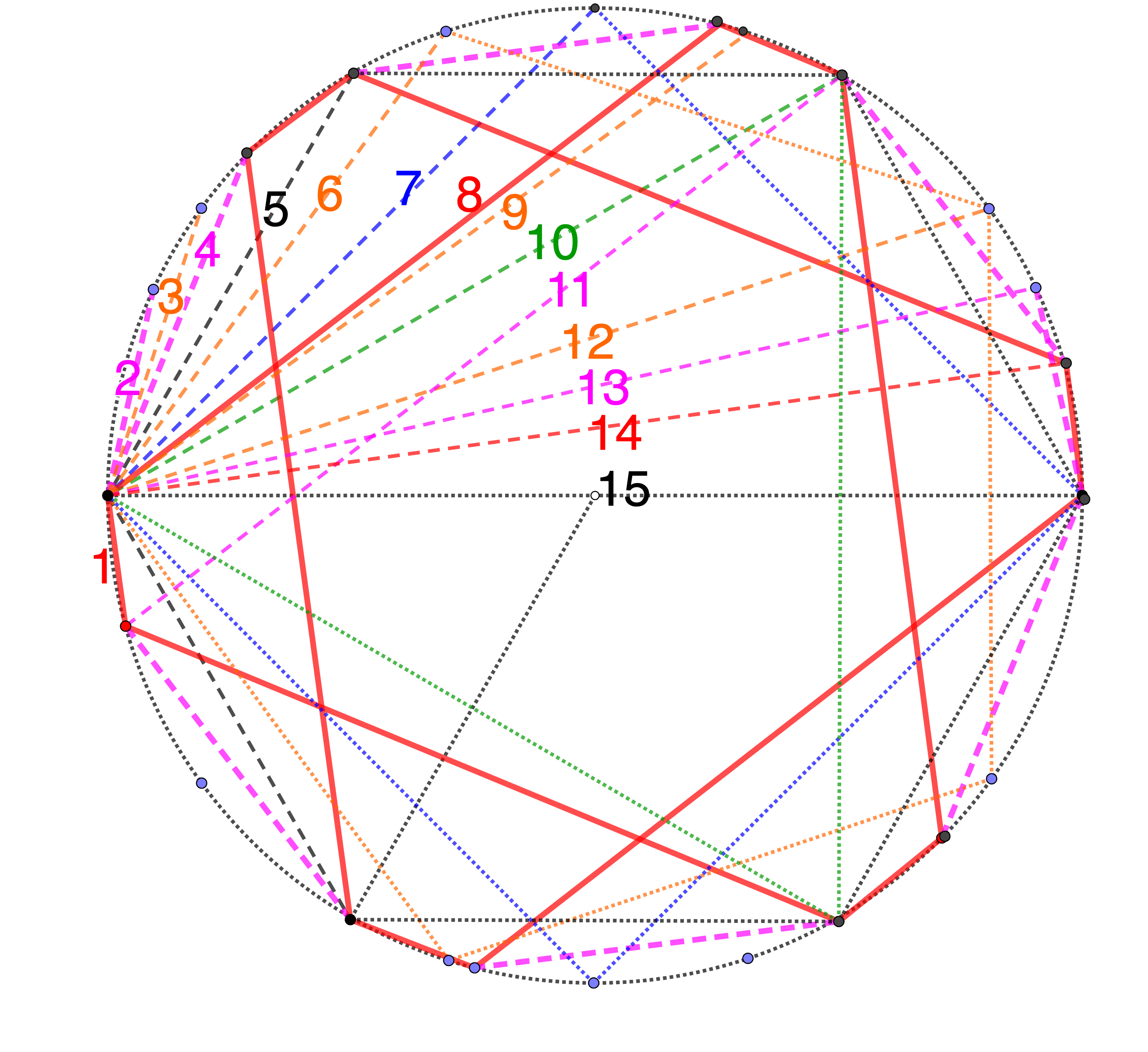
The major chords #1 - #15 join vertex pairs which are 1 - 15 edges apart on a Petrie polygon.

The annotated chord table is a complete bill of materials for constructing the 120-cell. All of the 2-polytopes, 3-polytopes and 4-polytopes in the 120-cell are made from the 15 1-polytopes in the table.

The black integers in table cells are incidence counts of the row's chord in the column's 4-polytope. For example, in the #3 chord row, the 600-cell's 72 great decagons contain 720 #3 chords in all.

The red integers are the number of disjoint 4-polytopes above (the column label) which compounded form a 120-cell. For example, the 120-cell is a compound of 25 disjoint 24-cells (25 * 24 vertices = 600 vertices).

The green integers are the number of distinct 4-polytopes above (the column label) which can be picked out in the 120-cell. For example, the 120-cell contains 225 distinct 24-cells which share components.

The blue integers in the right column are incidence counts of the row's chord at each 120-cell vertex. For example, in the #3 chord row, 24 #3 chords converge at each of the 120-cell's 600 vertices, forming a double icosahedral vertex figure 2{3,5}. In total 300 major chords of 15 distinct lengths meet at each vertex of the 120-cell.

=== Relationships among interior polytopes ===
The 120-cell is the compound of all five of the other regular convex 4-polytopes. All the relationships among the regular 1-, 2-, 3- and 4-polytopes occur in the 120-cell. It is a four-dimensional jigsaw puzzle in which all those polytopes are the parts. Although there are many sequences in which to construct the 120-cell by putting those parts together, ultimately they only fit together one way. The 120-cell is the unique solution to the combination of all these polytopes.

The regular 1-polytope occurs in only 15 distinct lengths in any of the component polytopes of the 120-cell. By Alexandrov's uniqueness theorem, convex polyhedra with shapes distinct from each other also have distinct metric spaces of surface distances, so each regular 4-polytope has its own unique subset of these 15 chords.

Only 4 of those 15 chords occur in the 16-cell, 8-cell and 24-cell. The four hypercubic chords √1, √2, √3 and √4 are sufficient to build the 24-cell and all its component parts. The 24-cell is the unique solution to the combination of these 4 chords and all the regular polytopes that can be built from them.

An additional 4 of the 15 chords are required to build the 600-cell. The four golden chords are square roots of irrational fractions that are functions of √5. The 600-cell is the unique solution to the combination of these 8 chords and all the regular polytopes that can be built from them. Notable among the new parts found in the 600-cell which do not occur in the 24-cell are pentagons, and icosahedra.

All 15 chords, and 15 other distinct chordal distances enumerated below, occur in the 120-cell. Notable among the new parts found in the 120-cell which do not occur in the 600-cell are regular 5-cells and √5/2 chords. (Note: Dodecahedra emerge as visible features in the 120-cell, but they also occur in the 600-cell as interior polytopes.) The relationships between the regular 5-cell (the simplex regular 4-polytope) and the other regular 4-polytopes are manifest directly only in the 120-cell. The 600-point 120-cell is a compound of 120 disjoint 5-point 5-cells, and it is also a compound of 5 disjoint 120-point 600-cells (two different ways). Each 5-cell has one vertex in each of 5 disjoint 600-cells, and therefore in each of 5 disjoint 24-cells, 5 disjoint 8-cells, and 5 disjoint 16-cells. (Note: No vertex pair of any of the 120 5-cells (no great digon central plane of a 5-cell) occurs in any of the 675 16-cells (the 675 Cartesian basis sets of 6 orthogonal central planes).) Each 5-cell is a ring (two different ways) joining 5 disjoint instances of each of the other regular 4-polytopes.

=== Compound of five 600-cells ===
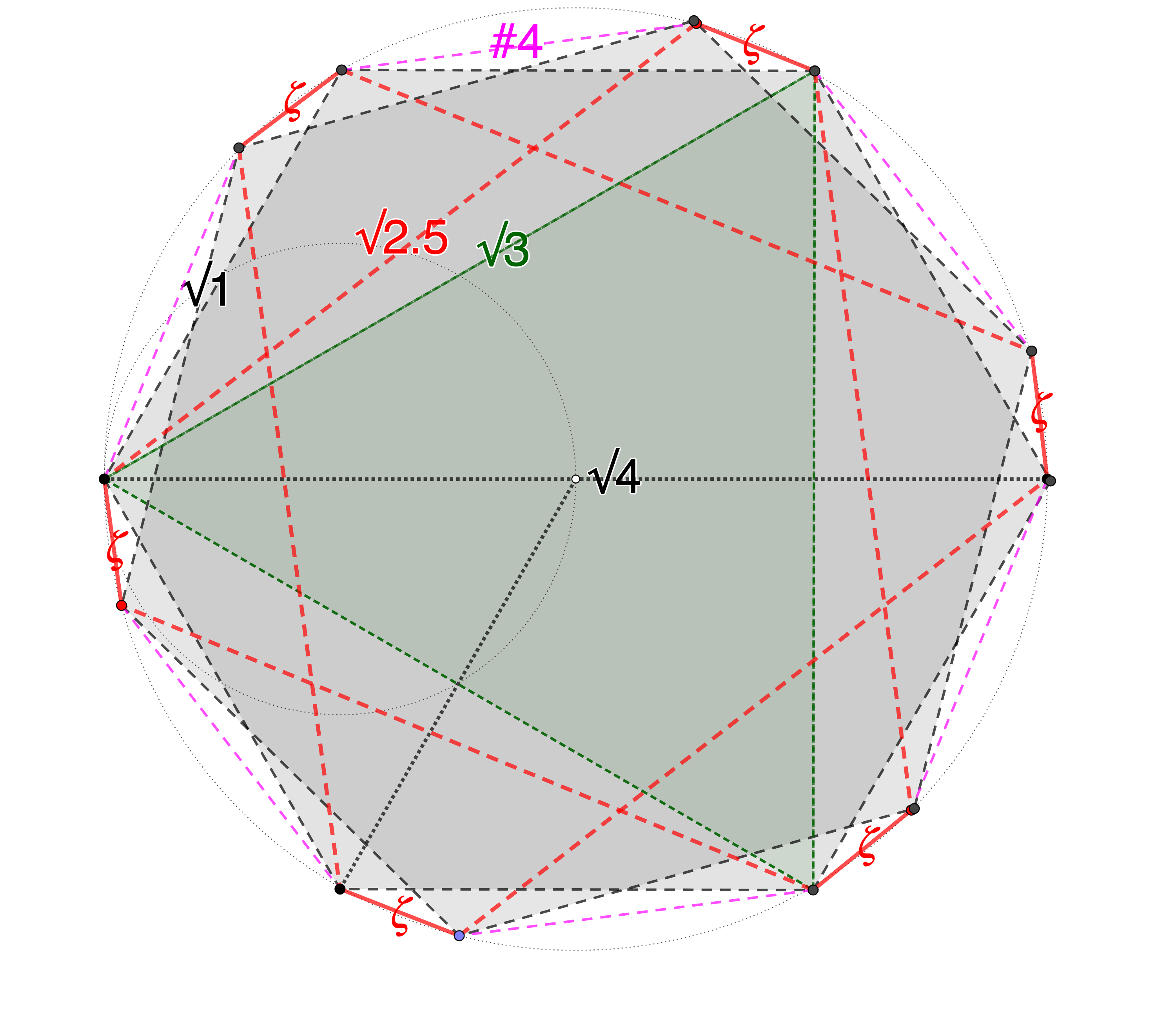
The 120-cell has 200 central planes that each intersect 12 vertices, forming an irregular dodecagon with alternating edges of two different lengths. Inscribed in the dodecagon are two regular great hexagons (black), two irregular great hexagons (red), and four equilateral great triangles (only one is shown, in green).

The 120-cell contains ten 600-cells which can be partitioned into five completely disjoint 600-cells two different ways. As a consequence of being a compound of five disjoint 600-cells, the 120-cell has 200 irregular great dodecagon {12} central planes, which are compounds of several of its great circle polygons that share the same central plane, as illustrated. The 200 {12} central planes originate as the compounds of the hexagonal central planes of the 25 disjoint inscribed 24-cells and the digon central planes of the 120 disjoint inscribed regular 5-cells; they contain all the 24-cell and 5-cell edges, and also the 120-cell edges. Thus the edges and characteristic rotations of the regular 5-cell, the 8-cell hypercube, the 24-cell, and the 120-cell all lie in these same 200 rotation planes. Each of the ten 600-cells occupies the entire set of 200 planes.

The 120-cell's irregular dodecagon {12} great circle polygon has 6 short edges (#1 chords marked 𝜁) alternating with 6 longer dodecahedron cell-diameters (#4 chords). Inscribed in the irregular great dodecagon are two irregular great hexagons (red) in alternate positions. Two regular great hexagons with edges of a third size (√1, the #5 chord) are also inscribed in the dodecagon. The 120-cell's irregular great dodecagon planes, its irregular great hexagon planes, its regular great hexagon planes, and its equilateral great triangle planes, are the same set of 200 dodecagon planes. They occur as 100 completely orthogonal pairs, and they are the same 200 central planes each containing a hexagon that are found in each of the 10 inscribed 600-cells.

There are exactly 400 regular hexagons in the 120-cell (two in each dodecagon central plane), and each of the ten 600-cells contains its own distinct subset of 200 of them (one from each dodecagon central plane). Each 600-cell contains only one of the two opposing regular hexagons inscribed in any dodecagon central plane, just as it contains only one of two opposing tetrahedra inscribed in any dodecahedral cell. Each 600-cell is disjoint from 4 other 600-cells, and shares regular hexagons with 5 other 600-cells. (Note: Each regular great hexagon is shared by two 24-cells in the same 600-cell, (Note: A 24-cell contains 16 hexagons. In the 600-cell, with 25 24-cells, each 24-cell is disjoint from 8 24-cells and intersects each of the other 16 24-cells in six vertices that form a hexagon. A 600-cell contains 25・16/2 = 200 such hexagons.) and each 24-cell is shared by two 600-cells. (Note: In the 120-cell, each 24-cell belongs to two different 600-cells. The 120-cell contains 225 distinct 24-cells and can be partitioned into 25 disjoint 24-cells, so it is the convex hull of a compound of 25 24-cells.) Each regular hexagon is shared by four 600-cells.) Each disjoint pair of 600-cells occupies the opposing pair of disjoint regular hexagons in every dodecagon central plane. Each non-disjoint pair of 600-cells intersects in 16 hexagons that comprise a 24-cell. The 120-cell contains 9 times as many distinct 24-cells (225) as disjoint 24-cells (25). Each 24-cell occurs in 9 600-cells, is absent from just one 600-cell, and is shared by two 600-cells.

=== Geodesic rectangles ===
The 30 distinct chords found in the 120-cell occur as 15 pairs of 180° complements. They form 15 distinct kinds of great circle polygon that lie in central planes of several kinds: △ planes that intersect {12} vertices in an irregular great dodecagon, 𝜙 planes that intersect {10} vertices in a regular decagon, and ☐ planes that intersect {4} vertices in several kinds of rectangle, including a square.

Each great circle polygon is characterized by its pair of 180° complementary chords. The chord pairs form great circle polygons with parallel opposing edges, so each great polygon is either a rectangle or a compound of a rectangle, with the two chords as the rectangle's edges.

Each of the 15 complementary chord pairs corresponds to a distinct pair of opposing polyhedral sections of the 120-cell, beginning with a vertex, the 0_{0} section. The correspondence is that each 120-cell vertex is surrounded by each polyhedral section's vertices at a uniform distance (the chord length), the way a polyhedron's vertices surround its center at the distance of its long radius. (Note: In the curved 3-dimensional space of the 120-cell's surface, each of the 600 vertices is surrounded by 15 pairs of polyhedral sections, each section at the "radial" distance of one of the 30 distinct chords. The vertex is not actually at the center of the polyhedron, because it is displaced in the fourth dimension out of the section's hyperplane, so that the apex vertex and its surrounding base polyhedron form a polyhedral pyramid. The characteristic chord is radial around the apex, as the pyramid's lateral edges.) The #1 chord is the "radius" of the 1_{0} section, the tetrahedral vertex figure of the 120-cell. The #14 chord is the "radius" of its congruent opposing 29_{0} section. The #7 chord is the "radius" of the central section of the 120-cell, in which two opposing 15_{0} sections are coincident.

30 chords (15 180° pairs) make 15 kinds of great circle polygons and polyhedral sections
Short chord				Great circle polygons	Long chord			
1_{0} #1		$1 / \phi^2\sqrt{2}$		400 irregular great hexagons (600 great rectangles) in 200 △ planes				29_{0} #14
1_{0} #1	15.5~°	√0.𝜀	0.270~	400 irregular great hexagons (600 great rectangles) in 200 △ planes	164.5~°	√3.93~	1.982~	29_{0} #14
2_{0} #2		$1 / \phi\sqrt{2}$		Great rectangles in ☐ planes				28_{0} #13
2_{0} #2	25.2~°	√0.19~	0.437~	Great rectangles in ☐ planes	154.8~°	√3.81~	1.952~	28_{0} #13
3_{0} #3	$\pi / 5$	$1 / \phi$		720 great decagons (3600 great rectangles) in 720 𝜙 planes	$4\pi / 5$	$\sqrt{2+\phi}$		27_{0} #12
3_{0} #3	36°	√0.𝚫	0.618~	720 great decagons (3600 great rectangles) in 720 𝜙 planes	144°	√3.𝚽	1.902~	27_{0} #12
4_{0} #3~4		$\sqrt{1}/\sqrt{2}$		Great rectangles in ☐ planes		$\sqrt{7} / \sqrt{2}$		26_{0} #11~12
4_{0} #3~4	41.4~°	√0.5	0.707~	Great rectangles in ☐ planes	138.6~°	√3.5	1.871~	26_{0} #11~12
5_{0} #4		$\sqrt{3} / \phi\sqrt{2}$		200 irregular great dodecagons (Note: This illustration shows just one of three related irregular great dodecagons that lie in three distinct △ central planes. Two of them (not shown) lie in Clifford parallel (disjoint) dodecagon planes, and share no vertices. The blue central rectangle of #4 and #11 edges lies in a third dodecagon plane, not Clifford parallel to either of the two disjoint dodecagon planes and intersecting them both; it shares two vertices (a √4 axis of the rectangle) with each of them. Each dodecagon plane contains two irregular great hexagons in alternate positions (not shown). Thus each #4 chord of the great rectangle shown is a bridge between two Clifford parallel irregular great hexagons that lie in the two dodecagon planes which are not shown. (Note: Isoclinic rotations take Clifford parallel planes to each other, as planes of rotation tilt sideways like coins flipping. The #4 chord bridge is significant in an isoclinic rotation in regular great hexagons (the 24-cell's characteristic rotation), in which the invariant rotation planes are a subset of the same 200 dodecagon central planes as the 120-cell's characteristic rotation (in irregular great hexagons). In each 12° arc of the 24-cell's characteristic rotation of the 120-cell, every regular great hexagon vertex is displaced to another vertex, in a Clifford parallel regular great hexagon that is a #4 chord away. Adjacent Clifford parallel regular great hexagons have six pairs of corresponding vertices joined by #4 chords. The six #4 chords are edges of six distinct great rectangles in six disjoint dodecagon central planes which are mutually Clifford parallel.)) (600 great rectangles) in 200 △ planes		$\phi^2 / \sqrt{2}$		25_{0} #11
5_{0} #4	44.5~°	√0.57~	0.757~	200 irregular great dodecagons (600 great rectangles) in 200 △ planes	135.5~°	√3.43~	1.851~	25_{0} #11
6_{0} #4~5				Great rectangles in ☐ planes				24_{0} #10~11~11
6_{0} #4~5	49.1~°	√0.69~	0.831~	Great rectangles in ☐ planes	130.9~°	√3.31~	1.819~	24_{0} #10~11~11
7_{0} #4~5~5				Great rectangles in ☐ planes				23_{0} #10~11
7_{0} #4~5~5	56°	√0.88~	0.939~	Great rectangles in ☐ planes	124°	√3.12~	1.766~	23_{0} #10~11
8_{0} #5	$\pi / 3$			400 regular great hexagons (1200 great rectangles) in 200 △ planes	$2\pi / 3$			22_{0} #10
8_{0} #5	60°	√1	1	400 regular great hexagons (1200 great rectangles) in 200 △ planes	120°	√3	1.732~	22_{0} #10
9_{0} #5~6				Great rectangles in ☐ planes				21_{0} #9~10~10
9_{0} #5~6	66.1~°	√1.19~	1.091~	Great rectangles in ☐ planes	113.9~°	√2.81~	1.676~	21_{0} #9~10~10
10_{0} #5~6~6				Great rectangles in ☐ planes				20_{0} #9~10
10_{0} #5~6~6	69.8~°	√1.31~	1.144~	Great rectangles in ☐ planes	110.2~°	√2.69~	1.640~	20_{0} #9~10
11_{0} #6	$2\pi/5$	$\sqrt{3-\phi}$		1440 great pentagons (3600 great rectangles) in 720 𝜙 planes	$3\pi / 5$	$\phi$		19_{0} #9
11_{0} #6	72°	√1.𝚫	1.175~	1440 great pentagons (3600 great rectangles) in 720 𝜙 planes	108°	√2.𝚽	1.618~	19_{0} #9
12_{0} #6~6~7		$\sqrt{3} / \sqrt{2}$		1200 great digon 5-cell edges (Note: The regular 5-cell has only digon central planes intersecting two vertices. The 120-cell with 120 inscribed regular 5-cells contains great rectangles whose longer edges are these digons, the edges of inscribed 5-cells of length √2.5. Three disjoint rectangles occur in one {12} central plane, where the six #8 √2.5 chords belong to six disjoint 5-cells. The 12_{0} sections and 18_{0} sections are regular tetrahedra of edge length √2.5, the cells of regular 5-cells. The regular 5-cells' ten triangle faces lie in those sections; each of a face's three √2.5 edges lies in a different {12} central plane.) (600 great rectangles) in 200 △ planes		$\sqrt{5} / \sqrt{2}$		18_{0} #8
12_{0} #6~6~7	75.5~°	√1.5	1.224~	1200 great digon 5-cell edges (600 great rectangles) in 200 △ planes	104.5~°	√2.5	1.581~	18_{0} #8
13_{0} #6~7				Great rectangles in ☐ planes				17_{0} #7~8~8
13_{0} #6~7	81.1~°	√1.69~	1.300~	Great rectangles in ☐ planes	98.9~°	√2.31~	1.520~	17_{0} #7~8~8
14_{0} #6~7~7				Great rectangles in ☐ planes				16_{0} #7~8
14_{0} #6~7~7	84.5~°	√0.81~	1.345~	Great rectangles in ☐ planes	95.5~°	√2.19~	1.480~	16_{0} #7~8
15_{0} #7	$\pi / 2$			4050 great squares in 4050 ☐ planes	$\pi / 2$			15_{0} #7
15_{0} #7	90°	√2	1.414~	4050 great squares in 4050 ☐ planes	90°	√2	1.414~	15_{0} #7

=== Concentric hulls ===
Orthogonal projection of the 120-cell using any 3 of these Cartesian coordinate dimensions forms an Overall Hull that is a chamfered dodecahedron of Norm=√8. Hulls 1, 2, & 7 are each pairs of dodecahedrons. Hull 3 is a pair of icosidodecahedrons. Hulls 4 & 5 are each pairs of truncated icosahedrons. Hull 6 is a pair of semi-regular rhombicosidodecahedrons. Hull 8 is a single non-uniform rhombicosidodecahedron, the central section.

These hulls illustrate sections 1 - 8 of the 120-cell beginning with a cell (hull 1). A section is a flat 3-dimensional hyperplane slice through the 3-sphere: a 2-sphere (ordinary sphere). It is dimensionally analogous to a flat 2-dimensional plane slice through a 2-sphere: a 1-sphere (ordinary circle).

The hulls are illustrated as if they were all the same size, but actually they increase in radius as numbered: they are concentric 2-spheres that nest inside each other. Every cell of the 120-cell is the smallest hull in its own set of 8 concentric hulls. There are 120 distinct nesting sets of 8 hulls.

The cell-first projection of the 120-cell actually has 15 sections beginning with a cell, numbered 1 - 15 with number 8 in the center. After increasing in size from 1 to 8, the hulls get smaller again. Sections 1 and 15 are both a hull 1, the smallest hull, a dodecahedral cell of the 120-cell. Section 8 is the central section, the largest hull, with the same radius as the 120-cell. Except for the central section 8, the sections occur in parallel pairs, on either side of the central section. Hull 8 is dimensionally analogous to the equator, while hulls 1 - 7 are dimensionally analogous to lines of latitude. There are 120 of each kind of hull 1 - 7 in the 120-cell, but only 60 of the central hull 8. A visualization of these 15 simplified sections is available in WP Commons with subgroup sections (when the inscribed solid has more than one permutation in its orbit) is here. The vertex-first projection (below) of the {5,3,3} 120-cell has 31 sections.

Coxeter's Table V-v sectioning of the {5,3,3} vertex-first 120-cell, showing the orbit sections and subgroup sections (when the inscribed solid has more than one permutation in its orbit), as well as the convex-hull of each orbit on the right.

=== Polyhedral graph ===
Considering the adjacency matrix of the vertices representing the polyhedral graph of the unit-radius 120-cell, the graph diameter is 15, connecting each vertex to its coordinate-negation at a Euclidean distance of 2 away (its circumdiameter), and there are 24 different paths to connect them along the polytope edges. From each vertex, there are 4 vertices at distance 1, 12 at distance 2, 24 at distance 3, 36 at distance 4, 52 at distance 5, 68 at distance 6, 76 at distance 7, 78 at distance 8, 72 at distance 9, 64 at distance 10, 56 at distance 11, 40 at distance 12, 12 at distance 13, 4 at distance 14, and 1 at distance 15. The adjacency matrix has 27 distinct eigenvalues ranging from 1/φ^{2}√2 ≈ 0.270, with a multiplicity of 4, to 2, with a multiplicity of 1. The multiplicity of eigenvalue 0 is 18, and the rank of the adjacency matrix is 582.

The vertices of the 120-cell polyhedral graph are 3-colorable.

The graph is Eulerian having degree 4 in every vertex. Its edge set can be decomposed into two Hamiltonian cycles.

=== Constructions ===
The 120-cell is the sixth in the sequence of 6 convex regular 4-polytopes (in order of size and complexity). It can be deconstructed into ten distinct instances (or five disjoint instances) of its predecessor (and dual) the 600-cell, just as the 600-cell can be deconstructed into twenty-five distinct instances (or five disjoint instances) of its predecessor the 24-cell, the 24-cell can be deconstructed into three distinct instances of its predecessor the tesseract (8-cell), and the 8-cell can be deconstructed into two disjoint instances of its predecessor (and dual) the 16-cell. The 120-cell contains 675 distinct instances (75 disjoint instances) of the 16-cell.

The reverse procedure to construct each of these from an instance of its predecessor preserves the radius of the predecessor, but generally produces a successor with a smaller edge length. The 600-cell's edge length is ~0.618 times its radius (the inverse golden ratio), but the 120-cell's edge length is ~0.270 times its radius.

The 120-cell is also the convex hull of the regular compound of 120 disjoint regular 5-cells. This can be seen to be equivalent to the compound of 5 disjoint 600-cells, as follows. Beginning with a single 120-point 600-cell, expand each vertex into a regular 5-cell. For each of the 120 vertices, add 4 new equidistant vertices, such that the 5 vertices form a regular 5-cell inscribed in the 3-sphere. The 120 5-cells are disjoint, and the 600 vertices form 5 disjoint 120-point 600-cells: a 120-cell.

==== Dual 600-cells ====
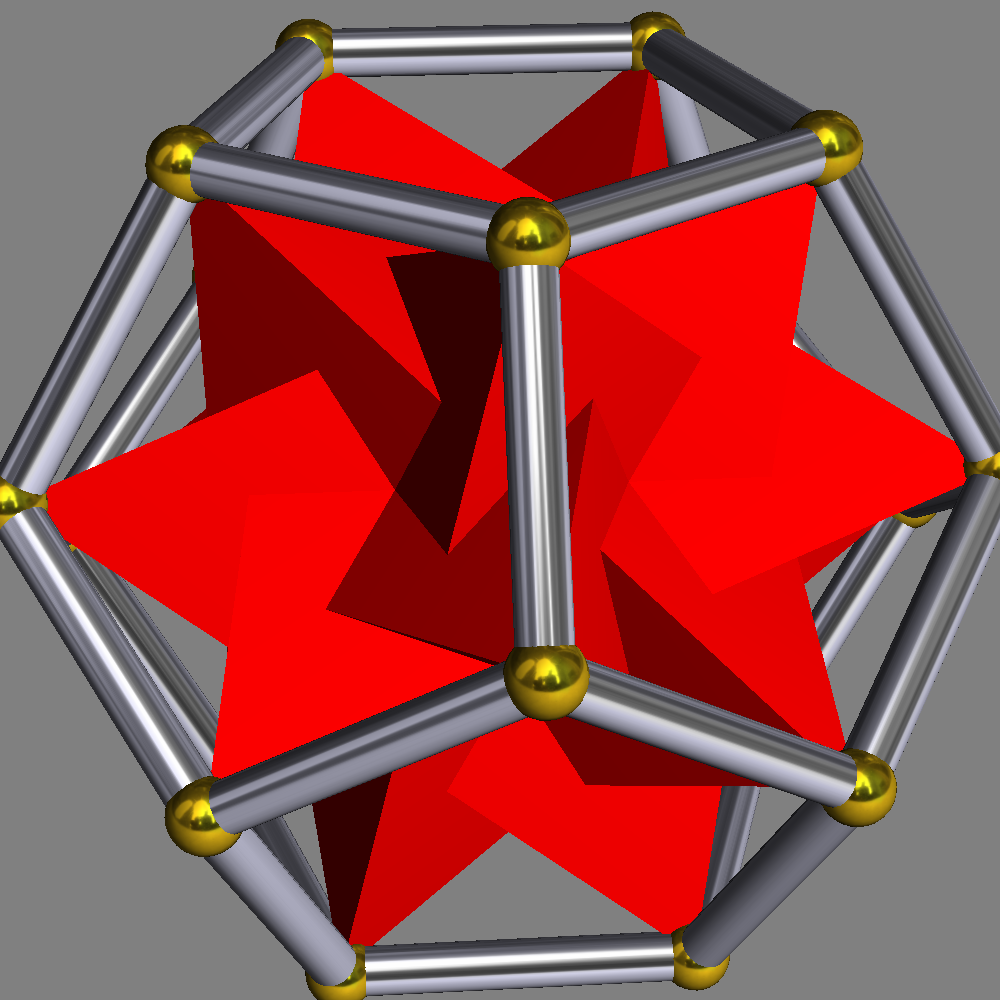
Five tetrahedra inscribed in a dodecahedron. Five opposing tetrahedra (not shown) can also be inscribed.

Since the 120-cell is the dual of the 600-cell, it can be constructed from the 600-cell by placing its 600 vertices at the center of volume of each of the 600 tetrahedral cells. From a 600-cell of unit long radius, this results in a 120-cell of slightly smaller long radius (φ^{2}/√8 ≈ 0.926) and edge length of exactly 1/4. Thus the unit edge-length 120-cell (with long radius φ^{2}√2 ≈ 3.702) can be constructed in this manner just inside a 600-cell of long radius 4. The unit radius 120-cell (with edge-length 1/φ^{2}√2 ≈ 0.270) can be constructed in this manner just inside a 600-cell of long radius √8/φ^{2} ≈ 1.080.

One of the five distinct cubes inscribed in the dodecahedron (dashed lines). Two opposing tetrahedra (not shown) lie inscribed in each cube, so ten distinct tetrahedra (one from each 600-cell in the 120-cell) are inscribed in the dodecahedron.

Reciprocally, the unit-radius 120-cell can be constructed just outside a 600-cell of slightly smaller long radius φ^{2}/√8 ≈ 0.926, by placing the center of each dodecahedral cell at one of the 120 600-cell vertices. The 120-cell whose coordinates are given above of long radius √8 = 2√2 ≈ 2.828 and edge-length 2/φ^{2} = 3−√5 ≈ 0.764 can be constructed in this manner just outside a 600-cell of long radius φ^{2}, which is smaller than √8 in the same ratio of ≈ 0.926; it is in the golden ratio to the edge length of the 600-cell, so that must be φ. The 120-cell of edge-length 2 and long radius φ^{2}√8 ≈ 7.405 given by Coxeter can be constructed in this manner just outside a 600-cell of long radius φ^{4} and edge-length φ^{3}.

Therefore, the unit-radius 120-cell can be constructed from its predecessor the unit-radius 600-cell in three reciprocation steps.

==== Cell rotations of inscribed duals ====
Since the 120-cell contains inscribed 600-cells, it contains its own dual of the same radius. The 120-cell contains five disjoint 600-cells (ten overlapping inscribed 600-cells of which we can pick out five disjoint 600-cells in two different ways), so it can be seen as a compound of five of its own dual (in two ways). The vertices of each inscribed 600-cell are vertices of the 120-cell, and (dually) each dodecahedral cell center is a tetrahedral cell center in each of the inscribed 600-cells.

The dodecahedral cells of the 120-cell have tetrahedral cells of the 600-cells inscribed in them. Just as the 120-cell is a compound of five 600-cells (in two ways), the dodecahedron is a compound of five regular tetrahedra (in two ways). As two opposing tetrahedra can be inscribed in a cube, and five cubes can be inscribed in a dodecahedron, ten tetrahedra in five cubes can be inscribed in a dodecahedron: two opposing sets of five, with each set covering all 20 vertices and each vertex in two tetrahedra (one from each set, but not the opposing pair of a cube obviously). This shows that the 120-cell contains, among its many interior features, 120 compounds of ten tetrahedra, each of which is dimensionally analogous to the whole 120-cell as a compound of ten 600-cells.

All ten tetrahedra can be generated by two chiral five-click rotations of any one tetrahedron. In each dodecahedral cell, one tetrahedral cell comes from each of the ten 600-cells inscribed in the 120-cell. (Note: The 10 tetrahedra in each dodecahedron overlap; but the 600 tetrahedra in each 600-cell do not, so each of the 10 must belong to a different 600-cell.) Therefore, the whole 120-cell, with all ten inscribed 600-cells, can be generated from just one 600-cell by rotating its cells.

==== Augmentation ====
Another consequence of the 120-cell containing inscribed 600-cells is that it is possible to construct it by placing 4-pyramids of some kind on the cells of the 600-cell. These tetrahedral pyramids must be quite irregular in this case (with the apex blunted into four 'apexes'), but we can discern their shape in the way a tetrahedron lies inscribed in a dodecahedron. (Note: Each 120-cell vertex figure is actually a low tetrahedral pyramid, an irregular 5-cell with a regular tetrahedron base.)

Only 120 tetrahedral cells of each 600-cell can be inscribed in the 120-cell's dodecahedra; its other 480 tetrahedra span dodecahedral cells. Each dodecahedron-inscribed tetrahedron is the center cell of a cluster of five tetrahedra, with the four others face-bonded around it lying only partially within the dodecahedron. The central tetrahedron is edge-bonded to an additional 12 tetrahedral cells, also lying only partially within the dodecahedron. (Note: As we saw in the 600-cell, these 12 tetrahedra belong (in pairs) to the 6 icosahedral clusters of twenty tetrahedral cells which surround each cluster of five tetrahedral cells.) The central cell is vertex-bonded to 40 other tetrahedral cells which lie entirely outside the dodecahedron.

==== Weyl orbits ====
Another construction method uses quaternions and the Icosahedral symmetry of Weyl group orbits $O(\Lambda)=W(H_4)=I$ of order 120. The following describe $T$ and $T'$ 24-cells as quaternion orbit weights of D4 under the Weyl group W(D4):
O(0100) : T = {±1,±e1,±e2,±e3,(±1±e1±e2±e3)/2}
O(1000) : V1
O(0010) : V2
O(0001) : V3

$$T'=\sqrt{2}\{V1\oplus V2\oplus V3 \} = \begin{pmatrix}
\frac{-1-e_1}{\sqrt{2}} & \frac{1-e_1}{\sqrt{2}} &
\frac{-1+e_1}{\sqrt{2}} & \frac{1+e_1}{\sqrt{2}} &
\frac{-e_2-e_3}{\sqrt{2}} & \frac{e_2-e_3}{\sqrt{2}} &
\frac{-e_2+e_3}{\sqrt{2}} & \frac{e_2+e_3}{\sqrt{2}}
\\
\frac{-1-e_2}{\sqrt{2}} & \frac{1-e_2}{\sqrt{2}} &
\frac{-1+e_2}{\sqrt{2}} & \frac{1+e_2}{\sqrt{2}} &
\frac{-e_1-e_3}{\sqrt{2}} & \frac{e_1-e_3}{\sqrt{2}} &
\frac{-e_1+e_3}{\sqrt{2}} & \frac{e_1+e_3}{\sqrt{2}}
\\
\frac{-e_1-e_2}{\sqrt{2}} & \frac{e_1-e_2}{\sqrt{2}} &
\frac{-e_1+e_2}{\sqrt{2}} & \frac{e_1+e_2}{\sqrt{2}} &
\frac{-1-e_3}{\sqrt{2}} & \frac{1-e_3}{\sqrt{2}} &
\frac{-1+e_3}{\sqrt{2}} & \frac{1+e_3}{\sqrt{2}}
\end{pmatrix};$$

With quaternions $(p,q)$ where $\bar p$ is the conjugate of $p$ and $[p,q]:r\rightarrow r'=prq$ and $[p,q]^*:r\rightarrow r''=p\bar rq$, then the Coxeter group $W(H_4)=\lbrace[p,\bar p] \oplus [p,\bar p]^*\rbrace$ is the symmetry group of the 600-cell and the 120-cell of order 14400.

Given $p \in T$ such that $\bar p=\pm p^4, \bar p^2=\pm p^3, \bar p^3=\pm p^2, \bar p^4=\pm p$ and $p^\dagger$ as an exchange of $-1/\varphi \leftrightarrow \varphi$ within $p$, we can construct:

- the snub 24-cell $S=\sum_{i=1}^4\oplus p^i T$
- the 600-cell $I=T+S=\sum_{i=0}^4\oplus p^i T$
- the 120-cell $J=\sum_{i,j=0}^4\oplus p^i\bar p^{\dagger j}T'$
- the alternate snub 24-cell $S'=\sum_{i=1}^4\oplus p^i\bar p^{\dagger i}T'$
- the dual snub 24-cell = $T \oplus T' \oplus S'$.

=== As a configuration ===
This configuration matrix represents the 120-cell. The rows and columns correspond to vertices, edges, faces, and cells. The diagonal numbers say how many of each element occur in the whole 120-cell. The nondiagonal numbers say how many of the column's element occur in or at the row's element.

$$\begin{bmatrix}\begin{matrix}600 & 4 & 6 & 4 \\ 2 & 1200 & 3 & 3 \\ 5 & 5 & 720 & 2 \\ 20 & 30 & 12 & 120 \end{matrix}\end{bmatrix}$$

Here is the configuration expanded with k-face elements and k-figures. The diagonal element counts are the ratio of the full Coxeter group order, 14400, divided by the order of the subgroup with mirror removal.

H_{4}	k-face	f_{k}	f_{0}	f_{1}	f_{2}	f_{3}	k-fig	Notes
A_{3}	( )	f_{0}	600	4	6	4	{3,3}	H_{4}/A_{3} = 14400/24 = 600
A_{1}A_{2}	{ }	f_{1}	2	1200	3	3	{3}	H_{4}/A_{2}A_{1} = 14400/6/2 = 1200
H_{2}A_{1}	{5}	f_{2}	5	5	720	2	{ }	H_{4}/H_{2}A_{1} = 14400/10/2 = 720
H_{3}	{5,3}	f_{3}	20	30	12	120	( )	H_{4}/H_{3} = 14400/120 = 120

== Visualization ==
The 120-cell consists of 120 dodecahedral cells. For visualization purposes, it is convenient that the dodecahedron has opposing parallel faces (a trait it shares with the cells of the tesseract and the 24-cell). One can stack dodecahedrons face to face in a straight line bent in the 4th direction into a great circle with a circumference of 10 cells. Starting from this initial ten cell construct there are two common visualizations one can use: a layered stereographic projection, and a structure of intertwining rings (discrete Hopf fibration).

=== Layered stereographic projection ===
The cell locations lend themselves to a hyperspherical description. Pick an arbitrary dodecahedron and label it the "north pole". Twelve great circle meridians (four cells long) radiate out in 3 dimensions, converging at the fifth "south pole" cell. This skeleton accounts for 50 of the 120 cells (2 + 4 × 12).

Starting at the North Pole, we can build up the 120-cell in 9 latitudinal layers, with allusions to terrestrial 2-sphere topography in the table below. With the exception of the poles, the centroids of the cells of each layer lie on a separate 2-sphere, with the equatorial centroids lying on a great 2-sphere. The centroids of the 30 equatorial cells form the vertices of an icosidodecahedron, with the meridians (as described above) passing through the center of each pentagonal face. The cells labeled "interstitial" in the following table do not fall on meridian great circles.

Layer #	Number of Cells	Description	Colatitude	Region
1	1 cell	North Pole	0°	Northern Hemisphere
2	12 cells	First layer of meridional cells / "Arctic Circle"	36°	Northern Hemisphere
3	20 cells	Non-meridian / interstitial	60°	Northern Hemisphere
4	12 cells	Second layer of meridional cells / "Tropic of Cancer"	72°	Northern Hemisphere
5	30 cells	Non-meridian / interstitial	90°	Equator
6	12 cells	Third layer of meridional cells / "Tropic of Capricorn"	108°	Southern Hemisphere
7	20 cells	Non-meridian / interstitial	120°	Southern Hemisphere
8	12 cells	Fourth layer of meridional cells / "Antarctic Circle"	144°	Southern Hemisphere
9	1 cell	South Pole	180°	Southern Hemisphere
Total	120 cells			

The cells of layers 2, 4, 6 and 8 are located over the faces of the pole cell. The cells of layers 3 and 7 are located directly over the vertices of the pole cell. The cells of layer 5 are located over the edges of the pole cell.

=== Intertwining rings ===
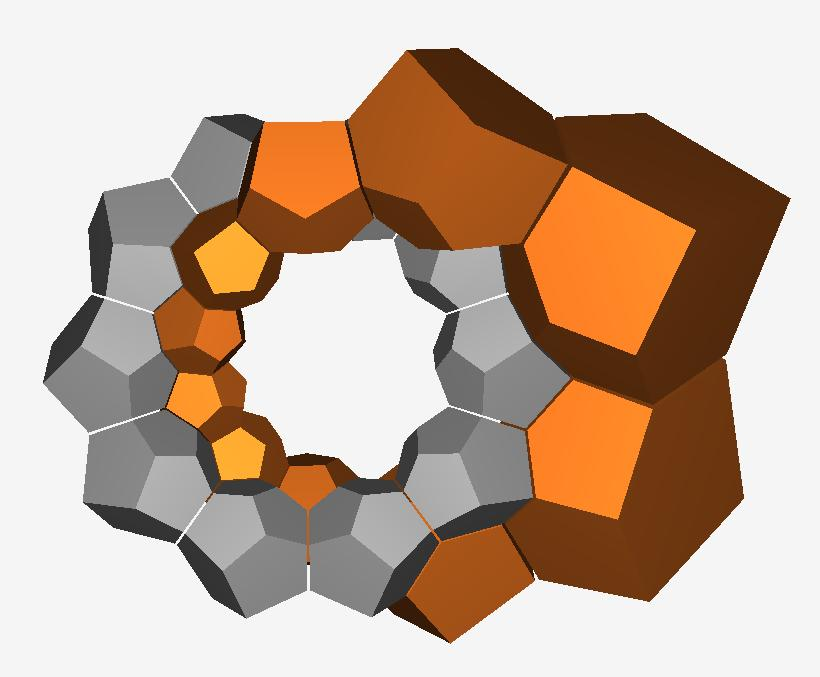
Two intertwining rings of the 120-cell

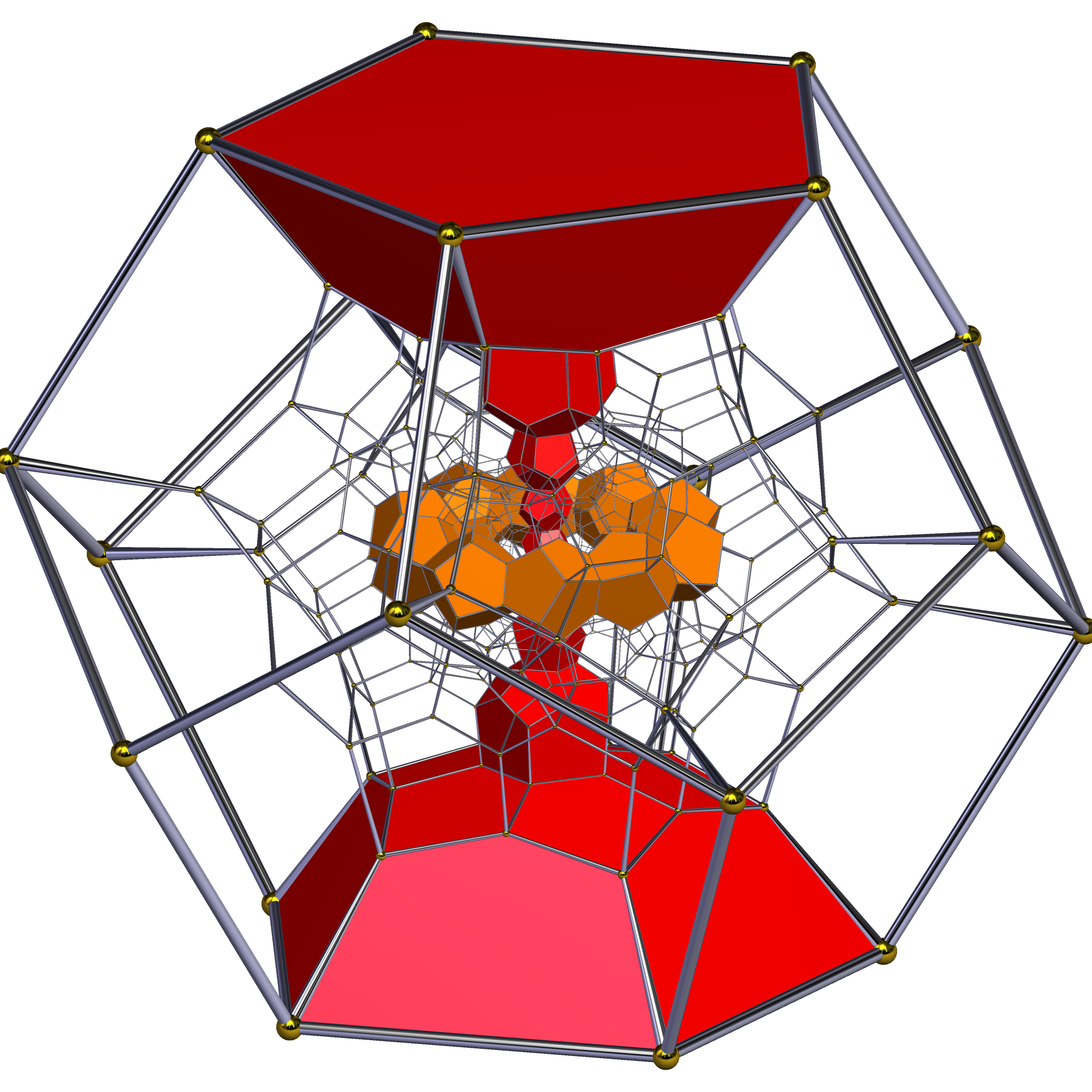
Two orthogonal rings in a cell-centered projection

The 120-cell can be partitioned into 12 disjoint 10-cell great circle rings, forming a discrete/quantized Hopf fibration. Starting with one 10-cell ring, one can place another ring alongside it that spirals around the original ring one complete revolution in ten cells. Five such 10-cell rings can be placed adjacent to the original 10-cell ring. Although the outer rings "spiral" around the inner ring (and each other), they actually have no helical torsion. They are all equivalent. The spiraling is a result of the 3-sphere curvature. The inner ring and the five outer rings now form a six ring, 60-cell solid torus. One can continue adding 10-cell rings adjacent to the previous ones, but it's more instructive to construct a second torus, disjoint from the one above, from the remaining 60 cells, that interlocks with the first. The 120-cell, like the 3-sphere, is the union of these two (Clifford) tori. If the center ring of the first torus is a meridian great circle as defined above, the center ring of the second torus is the equatorial great circle that is centered on the meridian circle. Also note that the spiraling shell of 50 cells around a center ring can be either left handed or right handed. It's just a matter of partitioning the cells in the shell differently, i.e. picking another set of disjoint (Clifford parallel) great circles.

=== Other great circle constructs ===
There is another great circle path of interest that alternately passes through opposing cell vertices, then along an edge. This path consists of 6 edges alternating with 6 cell diameter chords, forming an irregular dodecagon in a central plane. Both these great circle paths have dual great circle paths in the 600-cell. The 10 cell face to face path above maps to a 10 vertex path solely traversing along edges in the 600-cell, forming a decagon. The alternating cell/edge path maps to a path consisting of 12 tetrahedrons alternately meeting face to face then vertex to vertex (six triangular bipyramids) in the 600-cell. This latter path corresponds to a ring of six icosahedra meeting face to face in the snub 24-cell (or icosahedral pyramids in the 600-cell), forming a hexagon.

Another great circle polygon path exists which is unique to the 120-cell and has no dual counterpart in the 600-cell. This path consists of 3 120-cell edges alternating with 3 inscribed 5-cell edges (#8 chords), forming the irregular great hexagon with alternating short and long edges illustrated above. Each 5-cell edge runs through the volume of three dodecahedral cells (in a ring of ten face-bonded dodecahedral cells), to the opposite pentagonal face of the third dodecahedron. This irregular great hexagon lies in the same central plane (on the same great circle) as the irregular great dodecagon described above, but it intersects only {6} of the {12} dodecagon vertices. There are two irregular great hexagons inscribed in each irregular great dodecagon, in alternate positions.

=== 2D Orthogonal projections ===
Orthogonal projections of the 120-cell can be done in 2D by defining two orthonormal basis vectors for a specific view direction. The 30-gonal projection was made in 1963 by B. L. Chilton. The multiplicities of vertices by color are given in parentheses.

The H3 decagonal projection shows the plane of the van Oss polygon.

Orthographic projections by Coxeter planes
H_{4}	-	F_{4}
[30] (red=1)	[20] (red=1)	[12] (red=1)
H_{3}	A_{2} / B_{3} / D_{4}	A_{3} / B_{2}
[10] (red=5, orange=10)	[6] (red=1, orange=3, yellow=6, lime=9, green=12)	[4] (red=1, orange=2, yellow=4, lime=6, green=8)

=== 3D Perspective projections ===
These projections use perspective projection, from a specific viewpoint in four dimensions, projecting the model as a 3D shadow. Therefore, faces and cells that look larger are merely closer to the 4D viewpoint.

A comparison of perspective projections of the 3D dodecahedron to 2D (above left), and projections of the 4D 120-cell to 3D (below right), demonstrates two related perspective projection methods, by dimensional analogy. Schlegel diagrams use perspective to show depth in the dimension which has been flattened, choosing a view point above a specific cell, thus making that cell the envelope of the model, with other cells appearing smaller inside it. Stereographic projections use the same approach, but are shown with curved edges, representing the spherical polytope as a tiling of a 3-sphere. Both these methods distort the object, because the cells are not actually nested inside each other (they meet face-to-face), and they are all the same size. Other perspective projection methods exist, such as the rotating animations below, which do not exhibit this particular kind of distortion, but rather some other kind of distortion (as all projections must).

Comparison with regular dodecahedron
Projection	Dodecahedron	120-cell
Schlegel diagram	12 pentagon faces in the plane	120 dodecahedral cells in 3-space
Stereographic projection		With transparent faces

Enhanced perspective projections
Cell-first perspective projection at 5 times the distance from the center to a vertex, with these enhancements applied: Nearest dodecahedron to the 4D viewpoint rendered in yellow; The 12 dodecahedra immediately adjoining it rendered in cyan; The remaining dodecahedra rendered in green; Cells facing away from the 4D viewpoint (those lying on the "far side" of the 120-cell) culled to minimize clutter in the final image.
Vertex-first perspective projection at 5 times the distance from center to a vertex, with these enhancements: Four cells surrounding nearest vertex shown in 4 colors; Nearest vertex shown in white (center of image where 4 cells meet); Remaining cells shown in transparent green; Cells facing away from 4D viewpoint culled for clarity

=== Animations ===
Projections to 3D of a 4D 120-cell performing a simple rotation
From outside the 3-sphere in 4-space	Inside the 3D surface of the 3-sphere

In all the above projections of the 120-cell, only the edges of the 120-cell appear. All the other chords are not shown. The complex interior parts of the 120-cell, all its inscribed 600-cells, 24-cells, 8-cells, 16-cells and 5-cells, are completely invisible in all illustrations. The viewer must imagine them.

The following animation is an exception, which does show some chords of the 14400 vertex omnitruncated 120-cell (identical to the omnitruncated 600-cell given the symmetry of their Coxeter-Dynkin diagram), although it does not reveal the inscribed 4-polytopes. For a full display of each section orbits along with sub-section orbits, see this WP Commons omnitruncated 120-Cell SVG.

Coxeter section views

Sections of an omnitrucated 4D 600/120-cell 97 frames (=48x2 L/R+1 Center) shown in 4D to 3D Flatlander views. The center section is highlighted by also showing it as a combined set of convex hulls.

== Related polyhedra and honeycombs ==
=== H_{4} polytopes ===
The 120-cell is one of 15 regular and uniform polytopes with the same H_{4} symmetry [3,3,5]:

H_{4} family polytopes
120-cell	rectified 120-cell	truncated 120-cell	cantellated 120-cell	runcinated 120-cell	cantitruncated 120-cell	runcitruncated 120-cell	omnitruncated 120-cell
{5,3,3}	r{5,3,3}	t{5,3,3}	rr{5,3,3}	t_{0,3}{5,3,3}	tr{5,3,3}	t_{0,1,3}{5,3,3}	t_{0,1,2,3}{5,3,3}
600-cell	rectified 600-cell	truncated 600-cell	cantellated 600-cell	bitruncated 600-cell	cantitruncated 600-cell	runcitruncated 600-cell	omnitruncated 600-cell
{3,3,5}	r{3,3,5}	t{3,3,5}	rr{3,3,5}	2t{3,3,5}	tr{3,3,5}	t_{0,1,3}{3,3,5}	t_{0,1,2,3}{3,3,5}

Fundamental convex regular and uniform polytopes
Family	A_{n}	B_{n}	I_{2}(p) / D_{n}	E_{6} / E_{7} / E_{8} / F_{4} / G_{2}	H_{n}
Regular polygon	Triangle	Square	p-gon	Hexagon	Pentagon
Uniform polyhedron	Tetrahedron	Octahedron • Cube	Demicube		Dodecahedron • Icosahedron
Uniform polychoron	Pentachoron	16-cell • Tesseract	Demitesseract	24-cell	120-cell • 600-cell
Uniform 5-polytope	5-simplex	5-orthoplex • 5-cube	5-demicube		
Uniform 6-polytope	6-simplex	6-orthoplex • 6-cube	6-demicube	1_{22} • 2_{21}	
Uniform 7-polytope	7-simplex	7-orthoplex • 7-cube	7-demicube	1_{32} • 2_{31} • 3_{21}	
Uniform 8-polytope	8-simplex	8-orthoplex • 8-cube	8-demicube	1_{42} • 2_{41} • 4_{21}	
Uniform n-polytope	n-simplex	n-orthoplex • n-cube	n-demicube	1_{k2} • 2_{k1} • k_{21}	n-pentagonal polytope
Topics: Polytope families • Regular polytope • List of regular polytopes and compounds • Polytope operations

=== {p,3,3} polytopes ===
The 120-cell is similar to three regular 4-polytopes: the 5-cell {3,3,3} and tesseract {4,3,3} of Euclidean 4-space, and the hexagonal tiling honeycomb {6,3,3} of hyperbolic space. All of these have a tetrahedral vertex figure {3,3}:

{p,3,3} polytopes
Space	S^{3}			H^{3}			
Form	Finite			Paracompact	Noncompact		
Name	{3,3,3}	{4,3,3}	{5,3,3}	{6,3,3}	{7,3,3}	{8,3,3}	...{∞,3,3}
Image							
Cells {p,3}	{3,3}	{4,3}	{5,3}	{6,3}	{7,3}	{8,3}	{∞,3}

=== {5,3,p} polytopes ===
The 120-cell is a part of a sequence of 4-polytopes and honeycombs with dodecahedral cells:

{5,3,p} polytopes
Space	S^{3}	H^{3}					
Form	Finite	Compact		Paracompact	Noncompact		
Name	{5,3,3}	{5,3,4}	{5,3,5}	{5,3,6}	{5,3,7}	{5,3,8}	... {5,3,∞}
Image							
Vertex figure	{3,3}	{3,4}	{3,5}	{3,6}	{3,7}	{3,8}	{3,∞}

=== Tetrahedrally diminished 120-cell ===
Since the 600-point 120-cell has 5 disjoint inscribed 600-cells, it can be diminished by the removal of one of those 120-point 600-cells, creating an irregular 480-point 4-polytope. (Note: The diminishment of the 600-point 120-cell to a 480-point 4-polytope by removal of one if its 600-cells is analogous to the diminishment of the 120-point 600-cell by removal of one of its 5 disjoint inscribed 24-cells, creating the 96-point snub 24-cell. Similarly, the 8-cell tesseract can be seen as a 16-point diminished 24-cell from which one 8-point 16-cell has been removed.)

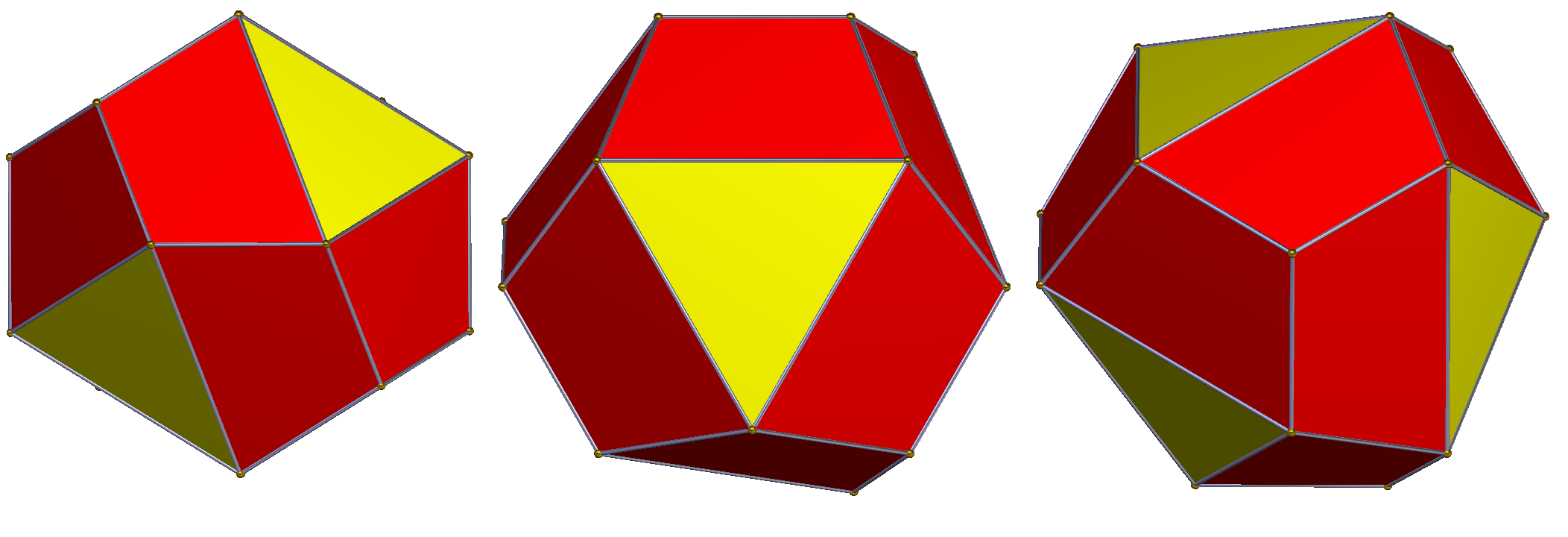
In the tetrahedrally diminished dodecahedron, 4 vertices are truncated to equilateral triangles. The 12 pentagon faces lose a vertex, becoming trapezoids.

Each dodecahedral cell of the 120-cell is diminished by removal of 4 of its 20 vertices, creating an irregular 16-point polyhedron called the tetrahedrally diminished dodecahedron because the 4 vertices removed formed a tetrahedron inscribed in the dodecahedron. Since the vertex figure of the dodecahedron is the triangle, each truncated vertex is replaced by a triangle. The 12 pentagon faces are replaced by 12 trapezoids, as one vertex of each pentagon is removed and two of its edges are replaced by the pentagon's diagonal chord. The tetrahedrally diminished dodecahedron has 16 vertices and 16 faces: 12 trapezoid faces and four equilateral triangle faces.

Since the vertex figure of the 120-cell is the tetrahedron, each truncated vertex is replaced by a tetrahedron, leaving 120 tetrahedrally diminished dodecahedron cells and 120 regular tetrahedron cells. The regular dodecahedron and the tetrahedrally diminished dodecahedron both have 30 edges, and the regular 120-cell and the tetrahedrally diminished 120-cell both have 1200 edges.

The 480-point diminished 120-cell may be called the tetrahedrally diminished 120-cell because its cells are tetrahedrally diminished, or the 600-cell diminished 120-cell because the vertices removed formed a 600-cell inscribed in the 120-cell, or even the regular 5-cells diminished 120-cell because removing the 120 vertices removes one vertex from each of the 120 inscribed regular 5-cells, leaving 120 regular tetrahedra.

=== Davis 120-cell manifold ===
The Davis 120-cell manifold, introduced by Davis (1985), is a compact 4-dimensional hyperbolic manifold obtained by identifying opposite faces of the 120-cell, whose universal cover gives the regular honeycomb {5,3,3,5} of 4-dimensional hyperbolic space.

== See also ==
- 57-cell – an abstract regular 4-polytope constructed from 57 hemi-dodecahedra.
- 600-cell - the dual 4-polytope to the 120-cell
- Uniform 4-polytope family with [5,3,3] symmetry
