= Truncated 120-cells =

Uniform 4-polytope

| 120-cell | Truncated 120-cell | Rectified 120-cell | Bitruncated 120-cell Bitruncated 600-cell |
| 600-cell | Truncated 600-cell | Rectified 600-cell | Bitruncated 120-cell Bitruncated 600-cell |
Orthogonal projections in H_{3} Coxeter plane

In geometry, a truncated 120-cell is a uniform 4-polytope formed as the truncation of the regular 120-cell.

There are three truncations, including a bitruncation, and a tritruncation, which creates the truncated 600-cell.

== Truncated 120-cell ==
Truncated 120-cell
Schlegel diagram (tetrahedron cells visible)
| Type | Uniform 4-polytope |
| Uniform index | 36 |
| Schläfli symbol | t_{0,1}{5,3,3} or t{5,3,3} |
| Coxeter diagrams | |
| Cells | 600 3.3.3; 120 3.10.10 |
| Faces | 2400 triangles 720 decagons |
| Edges | 4800 |
| Vertices | 2400 |
| Vertex figure | triangular pyramid |
| Dual | Tetrakis 600-cell |
| Symmetry group | H_{4}, [3,3,5], order 14400 |
| Properties | convex |

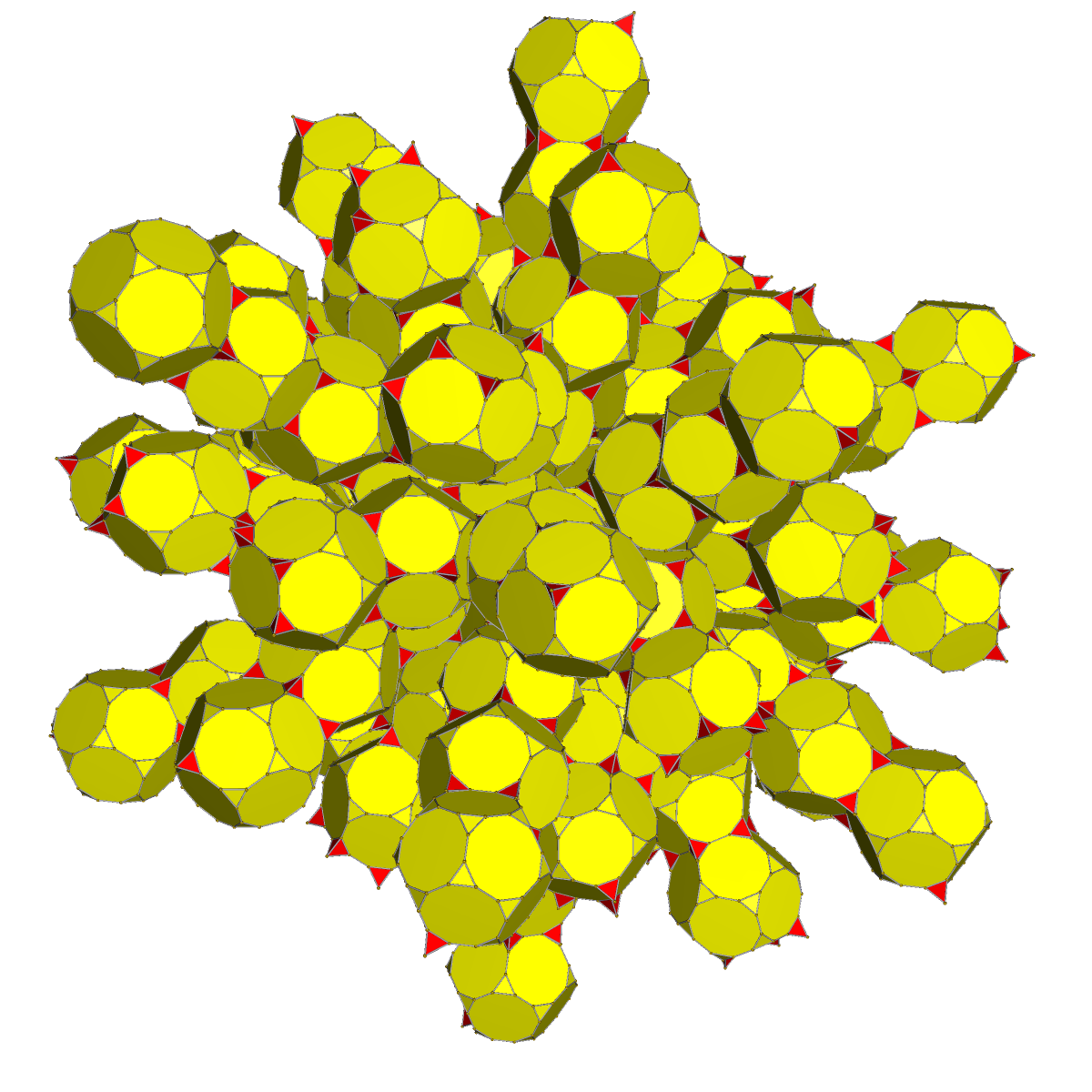
Net

The truncated 120-cell or truncated hecatonicosachoron is a uniform 4-polytope, constructed by a uniform truncation of the regular 120-cell 4-polytope.

It is made of 120 truncated dodecahedral and 600 tetrahedral cells. It has 3120 faces: 2400 being triangles and 720 being decagons. There are 4800 edges of two types: 3600 shared by three truncated dodecahedra and 1200 are shared by two truncated dodecahedra and one tetrahedron. Each vertex has 3 truncated dodecahedra and one tetrahedron around it. Its vertex figure is an equilateral triangular pyramid.

=== Alternate names ===
- Truncated 120-cell (Norman W. Johnson)
  - Tuncated hecatonicosachoron / Truncated dodecacontachoron / Truncated polydodecahedron
- Truncated-icosahedral hexacosihecatonicosachoron (Acronym thi) (George Olshevsky, and Jonathan Bowers)

=== Images ===
Orthographic projections by Coxeter planes
| H_{4} | - | F_{4} |
|---|---|---|
| [30] | [20] | [12] |
| H_{3} | A_{2} | A_{3} |
| [10] | [6] | [4] |

| net | Central part of stereographic projection (centered on truncated dodecahedron) | Stereographic projection |

== Bitruncated 120-cell ==
Bitruncated 120-cell
Schlegel diagram, centered on truncated icosahedron, truncated tetrahedral cells visible
| Type | Uniform 4-polytope |
| Uniform index | 39 |
| Coxeter diagram | |
| Schläfli symbol | t_{1,2}{5,3,3} or 2t{5,3,3} |
| Cells | 720: 120 5.6.6; 600 3.6.6 |
| Faces | 4320: 1200{3}+720{5}+ 2400{6} |
| Edges | 7200 |
| Vertices | 3600 |
| Vertex figure | digonal disphenoid |
| Symmetry group | H_{4}, [3,3,5], order 14400 |
| Properties | convex, vertex-transitive |

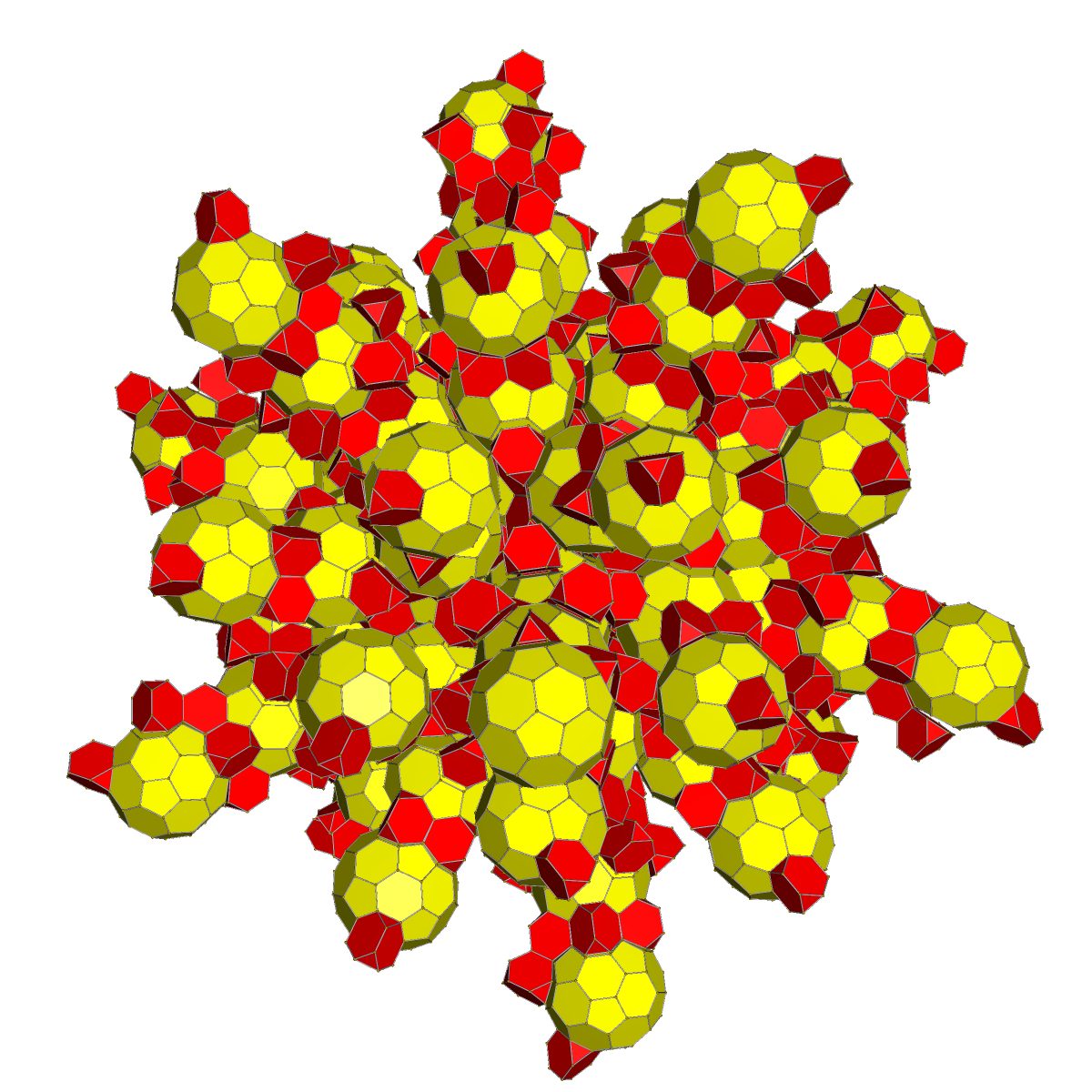
Net

The bitruncated 120-cell or hexacosihecatonicosachoron is a uniform 4-polytope. It has 720 cells: 120 truncated icosahedra, and 600 truncated tetrahedra. Its vertex figure is a digonal disphenoid, with two truncated icosahedra and two truncated tetrahedra around it.

=== Alternate names ===
- Bitruncated 120-cell / Bitruncated 600-cell (Norman W. Johnson)
  - Bitruncated hecatonicosachoron / Bitruncated hexacosichoron / Bitruncated polydodecahedron / Bitruncated polytetrahedron
- Truncated-icosahedral hexacosihecatonicosachoron (Acronym Xhi) (George Olshevsky, and Jonathan Bowers)

=== Images ===
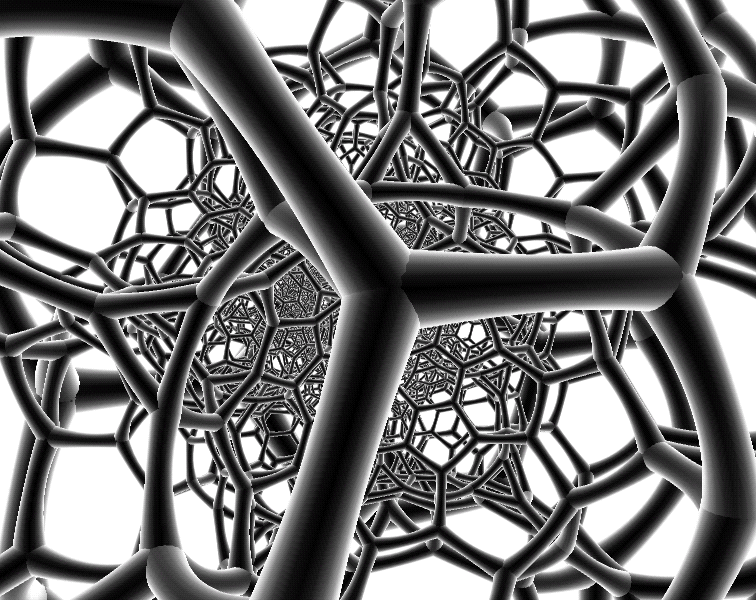
Stereographic projection (Close up)

Orthographic projections by Coxeter planes
| H_{3} | A_{2} / B_{3} / D_{4} | A_{3} / B_{2} / D_{3} |
|---|---|---|
| [10] | [6] | [4] |

== Truncated 600-cell ==
Truncated 600-cell
Schlegel diagram (icosahedral cells visible)
| Type | Uniform 4-polytope |
| Uniform index | 41 |
| Schläfli symbol | t_{0,1}{3,3,5} or t{3,3,5} |
| Coxeter diagram | |
| Cells | 720: 120 3.3.3.3.3; 600 3.6.6 |
| Faces | 2400{3}+1200{6} |
| Edges | 4320 |
| Vertices | 1440 |
| Vertex figure | pentagonal pyramid |
| Dual | Dodecakis 120-cell |
| Symmetry group | H_{4}, [3,3,5], order 14400 |
| Properties | convex |

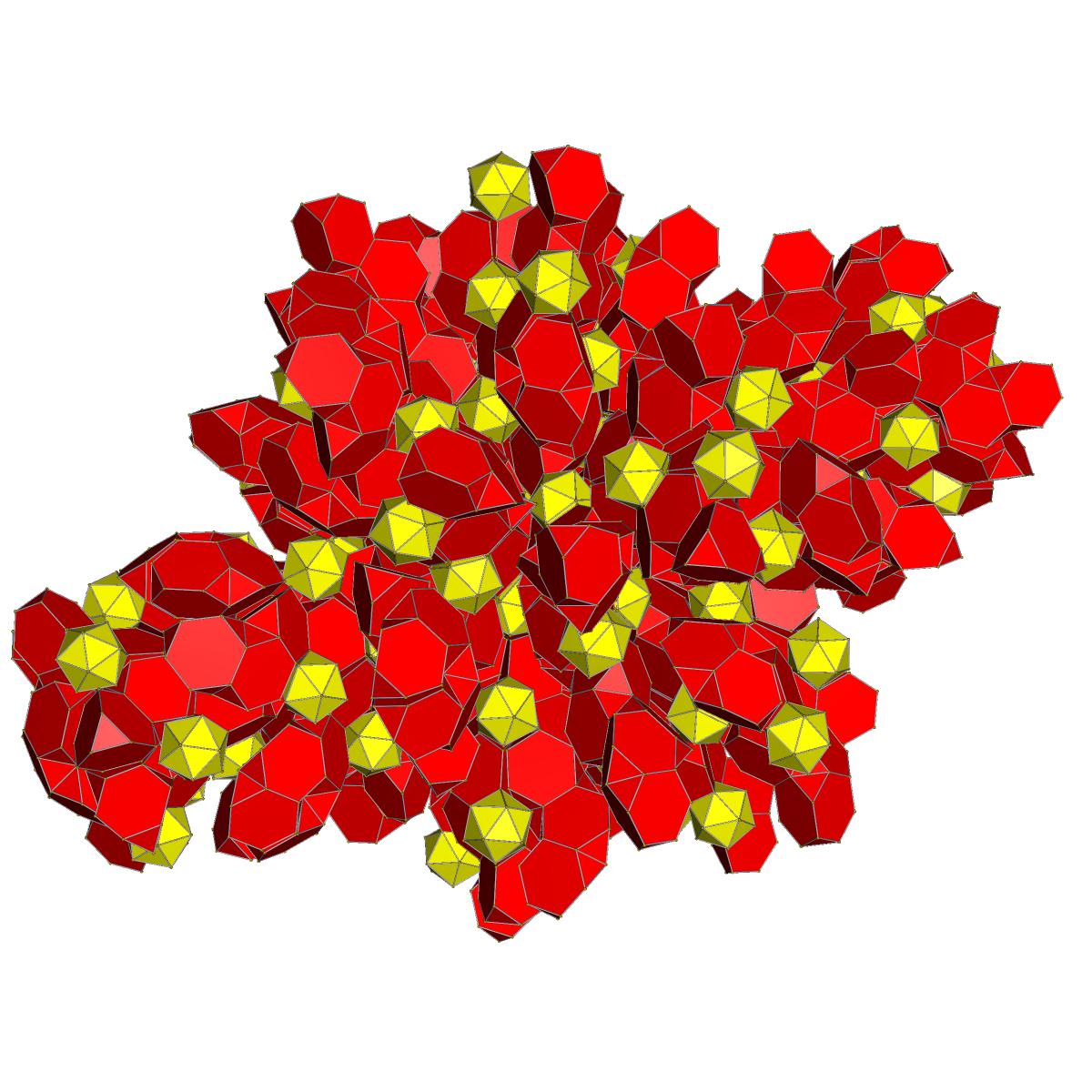
Net

The truncated 600-cell or truncated hexacosichoron is a uniform 4-polytope. It is derived from the 600-cell by truncation. It has 720 cells: 120 icosahedra and 600 truncated tetrahedra. Its vertex figure is a pentagonal pyramid, with one icosahedron on the base, and 5 truncated tetrahedra around the sides.

=== Alternate names ===
- Truncated 600-cell (Norman W. Johnson)
- Truncated hexacosichoron (Acronym tex) (George Olshevsky, and Jonathan Bowers)
- Truncated tetraplex (Conway)

=== Structure ===
The truncated 600-cell consists of 600 truncated tetrahedra and 120 icosahedra. The truncated tetrahedral cells are joined to each other via their hexagonal faces, and to the icosahedral cells via their triangular faces. Each icosahedron is surrounded by 20 truncated tetrahedra.

=== Images ===
Stereographic projection or Schlegel diagrams
| Centered on icosahedron | Centered on truncated tetrahedron | Central part and some of 120 red icosahedra. |

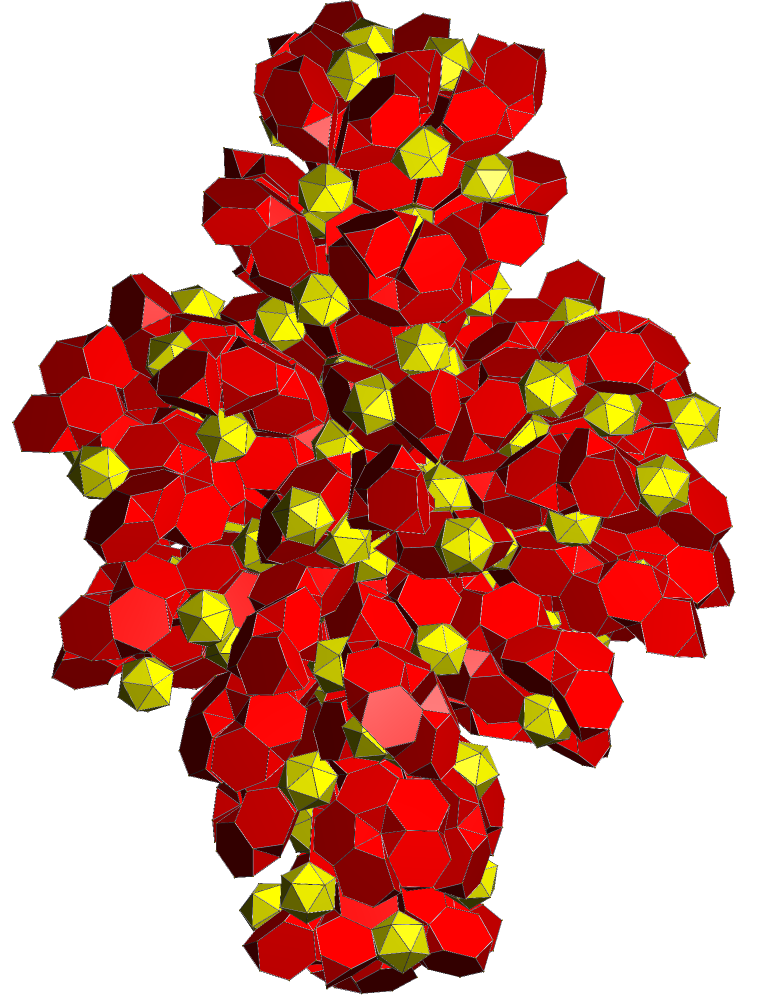
Net

Orthographic projections by Coxeter planes
| H_{4} | - | F_{4} |
|---|---|---|
| [30] | [20] | [12] |
| H_{3} | A_{2} / B_{3} / D_{4} | A_{3} / B_{2} |
| [10] | [6] | [4] |

3D Parallel projection
| Parallel projection into 3 dimensions, centered on an icosahedron. Nearest icosahedron to the 4D viewpoint rendered in red, remaining icosahedra in yellow. Truncated tetrahedra in transparent green. |

== Related polytopes ==
H_{4} family polytopes
| 120-cell | rectified 120-cell | truncated 120-cell | cantellated 120-cell | runcinated 120-cell | cantitruncated 120-cell | runcitruncated 120-cell | omnitruncated 120-cell |
| {5,3,3} | r{5,3,3} | t{5,3,3} | rr{5,3,3} | t_{0,3}{5,3,3} | tr{5,3,3} | t_{0,1,3}{5,3,3} | t_{0,1,2,3}{5,3,3} |
| 600-cell | rectified 600-cell | truncated 600-cell | cantellated 600-cell | bitruncated 600-cell | cantitruncated 600-cell | runcitruncated 600-cell | omnitruncated 600-cell |
| {3,3,5} | r{3,3,5} | t{3,3,5} | rr{3,3,5} | 2t{3,3,5} | tr{3,3,5} | t_{0,1,3}{3,3,5} | t_{0,1,2,3}{3,3,5} |

== Notes ==
Fundamental convex regular and uniform polytopes in dimensions 2–10
| Family | A_{n} | B_{n} | I_{2}(p) / D_{n} | E_{6} / E_{7} / E_{8} / F_{4} / G_{2} | H_{n} |
| Regular polygon | Triangle | Square | p-gon | Hexagon | Pentagon |
| Uniform polyhedron | Tetrahedron | Octahedron • Cube | Demicube | | Dodecahedron • Icosahedron |
| Uniform polychoron | Pentachoron | 16-cell • Tesseract | Demitesseract | 24-cell | 120-cell • 600-cell |
| Uniform 5-polytope | 5-simplex | 5-orthoplex • 5-cube | 5-demicube | | |
| Uniform 6-polytope | 6-simplex | 6-orthoplex • 6-cube | 6-demicube | 1_{22} • 2_{21} | |
| Uniform 7-polytope | 7-simplex | 7-orthoplex • 7-cube | 7-demicube | 1_{32} • 2_{31} • 3_{21} | |
| Uniform 8-polytope | 8-simplex | 8-orthoplex • 8-cube | 8-demicube | 1_{42} • 2_{41} • 4_{21} | |
| Uniform 9-polytope | 9-simplex | 9-orthoplex • 9-cube | 9-demicube | | |
| Uniform 10-polytope | 10-simplex | 10-orthoplex • 10-cube | 10-demicube | | |
| Uniform n-polytope | n-simplex | n-orthoplex • n-cube | n-demicube | 1_{k2} • 2_{k1} • k_{21} | n-pentagonal polytope |
Topics: Polytope families • Regular polytope • List of regular polytopes and compounds • Polytope operations
