= List of F4 polytopes =

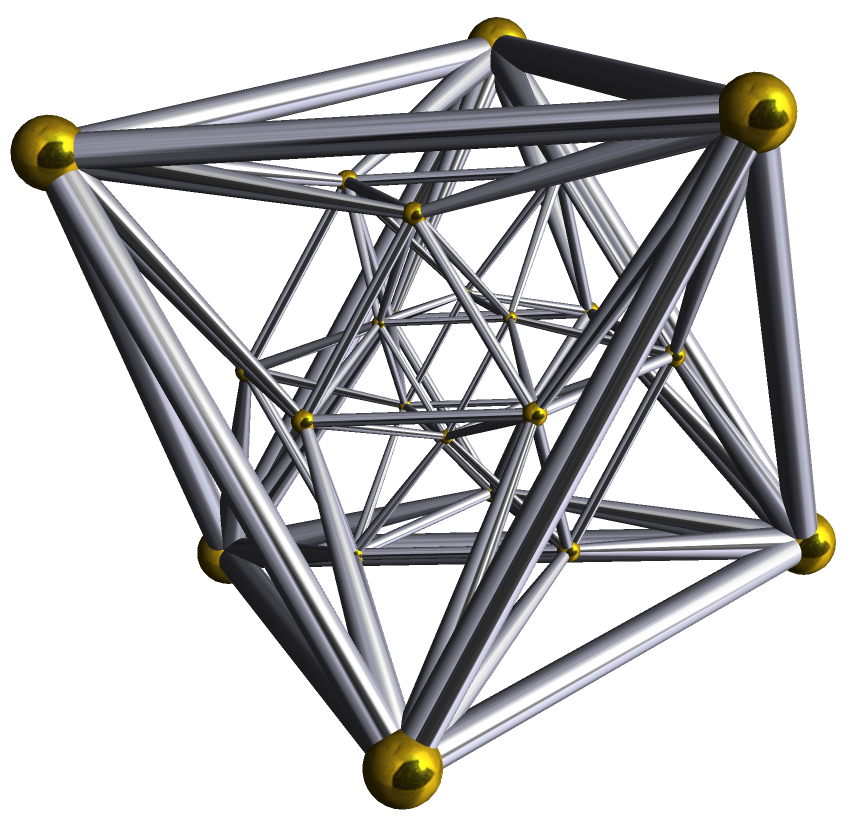
24-cell

In 4-dimensional geometry, there are 9 uniform 4-polytopes with F_{4} symmetry, and one chiral half symmetry, the snub 24-cell. There is one self-dual regular form, the 24-cell with 24 vertices.

== Visualization ==
Each can be visualized as symmetric orthographic projections in Coxeter planes of the F_{4} Coxeter group, and other subgroups.

The 3D picture are drawn as Schlegel diagram projections, centered on the cell at pos. 3, with a consistent orientation, and the 5 cells at position 0 are shown solid.

F4, [3,4,3] symmetry polytopes
#	Name Coxeter diagram Schläfli symbol	Graph			Schlegel diagram		Net	
#	Name Coxeter diagram Schläfli symbol	F_{4} [12]	B_{4} [8]	B_{3} [6]	B_{2} [4]	Octahedron centered	Net	Dual octahedron centered
1	24-cell (rectified 16-cell) = {3,4,3} = r{3,3,4}							
2	rectified 24-cell (cantellated 16-cell) = r{3,4,3} = rr{3,3,4}							
3	truncated 24-cell (cantitruncated 16-cell) = t{3,4,3} = tr{3,3,4}							
4	cantellated 24-cell rr{3,4,3}							
5	cantitruncated 24-cell tr{3,4,3}							
6	runcitruncated 24-cell t_{0,1,3}{3,4,3}							

[[3,3,3]] extended symmetries of F4
#	Name Coxeter diagram Schläfli symbol	Graph				Schlegel diagram	Net
#	Name Coxeter diagram Schläfli symbol	F_{4} [[12]] = [24]	B_{4} [8]	B_{3} [6]	B_{2} [[4]] = [8]	Octahedron centered	Net
7	*runcinated 24-cell t_{0,3}{3,4,3}						
8	*bitruncated 24-cell 2t{3,4,3}						
9	*omnitruncated 24-cell t_{0,1,2,3}{3,4,3}						

[3^{+},4,3] half symmetries of F4
#	Name Coxeter diagram Schläfli symbol	Graph				Schlegel diagram		Orthogonal Projection	Net
#	Name Coxeter diagram Schläfli symbol	F_{4} [12]^{+}	B_{4} [8]	B_{3} [6]^{+}	B_{2} [4]	Octahedron centered	Dual octahedron centered	Octahedron centered	Net
10	snub 24-cell s{3,4,3}								
11 Nonuniform	runcic snub 24-cell s_{3}{3,4,3}								

== Coordinates ==
Vertex coordinates for all 15 forms are given below, including dual configurations from the two regular 24-cells. (The dual configurations are named in bold.) Active rings in the first and second nodes generate points in the first column. Active rings in the third and fourth nodes generate the points in the second column. The sum of each of these points are then permutated by coordinate positions, and sign combinations. This generates all vertex coordinates. Edge lengths are 2.

The only exception is the snub 24-cell, which is generated by half of the coordinate permutations, only an even number of coordinate swaps. φ=(√5+1)/2.

24-cell family coordinates
#	Base point(s) t(0,1)	Base point(s) t(2,3)	Schläfli symbol	Name	Coxeter diagram
1		(0,0,1,1)√2	{3,4,3}	24-cell	
2		(0,1,1,2)√2	r{3,4,3}	rectified 24-cell	
3		(0,1,2,3)√2	t{3,4,3}	truncated 24-cell	
10		(0,1,φ,φ+1)√2	s{3,4,3}	snub 24-cell	
2	(0,2,2,2) (1,1,1,3)		r{3,4,3}	rectified 24-cell	
4	(0,2,2,2) + (1,1,1,3) +	(0,0,1,1)√2 "	rr{3,4,3}	cantellated 24-cell	
8	(0,2,2,2) + (1,1,1,3) +	(0,1,1,2)√2 "	2t{3,4,3}	bitruncated 24-cell	
5	(0,2,2,2) + (1,1,1,3) +	(0,1,2,3)√2 "	tr{3,4,3}	cantitruncated 24-cell	
1	(0,0,0,2) (1,1,1,1)		{3,4,3}	24-cell	
7	(0,0,0,2) + (1,1,1,1) +	(0,0,1,1)√2 "	t_{0,3}{3,4,3}	runcinated 24-cell	
4	(0,0,0,2) + (1,1,1,1) +	(0,1,1,2)√2 "	t_{1,3}{3,4,3}	cantellated 24-cell	
6	(0,0,0,2) + (1,1,1,1) +	(0,1,2,3)√2 "	t_{0,1,3}{3,4,3}	runcitruncated 24-cell	
3	(1,1,1,5) (1,3,3,3) (2,2,2,4)		t{3,4,3}	truncated 24-cell	
6	(1,1,1,5) + (1,3,3,3) + (2,2,2,4) +	(0,0,1,1)√2 " "	t_{0,2,3}{3,4,3}	runcitruncated 24-cell	
5	(1,1,1,5) + (1,3,3,3) + (2,2,2,4) +	(0,1,1,2)√2 " "	tr{3,4,3}	cantitruncated 24-cell	
9	(1,1,1,5) + (1,3,3,3) + (2,2,2,4) +	(0,1,2,3)√2 " "	t_{0,1,2,3}{3,4,3}	Omnitruncated 24-cell	

Fundamental convex regular and uniform polytopes in dimensions 2–10
Family	A_{n}	B_{n}	I_{2}(p) / D_{n}	E_{6} / E_{7} / E_{8} / F_{4} / G_{2}	H_{n}
Regular polygon	Triangle	Square	p-gon	Hexagon	Pentagon
Uniform polyhedron	Tetrahedron	Octahedron • Cube	Demicube		Dodecahedron • Icosahedron
Uniform polychoron	Pentachoron	16-cell • Tesseract	Demitesseract	24-cell	120-cell • 600-cell
Uniform 5-polytope	5-simplex	5-orthoplex • 5-cube	5-demicube		
Uniform 6-polytope	6-simplex	6-orthoplex • 6-cube	6-demicube	1_{22} • 2_{21}	
Uniform 7-polytope	7-simplex	7-orthoplex • 7-cube	7-demicube	1_{32} • 2_{31} • 3_{21}	
Uniform 8-polytope	8-simplex	8-orthoplex • 8-cube	8-demicube	1_{42} • 2_{41} • 4_{21}	
Uniform 9-polytope	9-simplex	9-orthoplex • 9-cube	9-demicube		
Uniform 10-polytope	10-simplex	10-orthoplex • 10-cube	10-demicube		
Uniform n-polytope	n-simplex	n-orthoplex • n-cube	n-demicube	1_{k2} • 2_{k1} • k_{21}	n-pentagonal polytope
Topics: Polytope families • Regular polytope • List of regular polytopes and compounds • Polytope operations
