= Cantellated 24-cells =

24-cell	Cantellated 24-cell	Cantitruncated 24-cell
Orthogonal projections in F_{4} Coxeter plane

In four-dimensional geometry, a cantellated 24-cell is a convex uniform 4-polytope, being a cantellation (a 2nd order truncation) of the regular 24-cell.

There are 2 unique degrees of cantellations of the 24-cell including permutations with truncations.

== Cantellated 24-cell ==
Cantellated 24-cell
Type	Uniform 4-polytope	
Schläfli symbol	rr{3,4,3} s_{2}{3,4,3}	
Coxeter diagram		
Cells	144	24 (3.4.4.4); 24 (3.4.3.4) 96 (3.4.4)
Faces	720	288 triangles 432 squares
Edges	864	
Vertices	288	
Vertex figure	Wedge	
Symmetry group	F_{4}, [3,4,3], order 1152	
Properties	convex	
Uniform index	24 25 26	

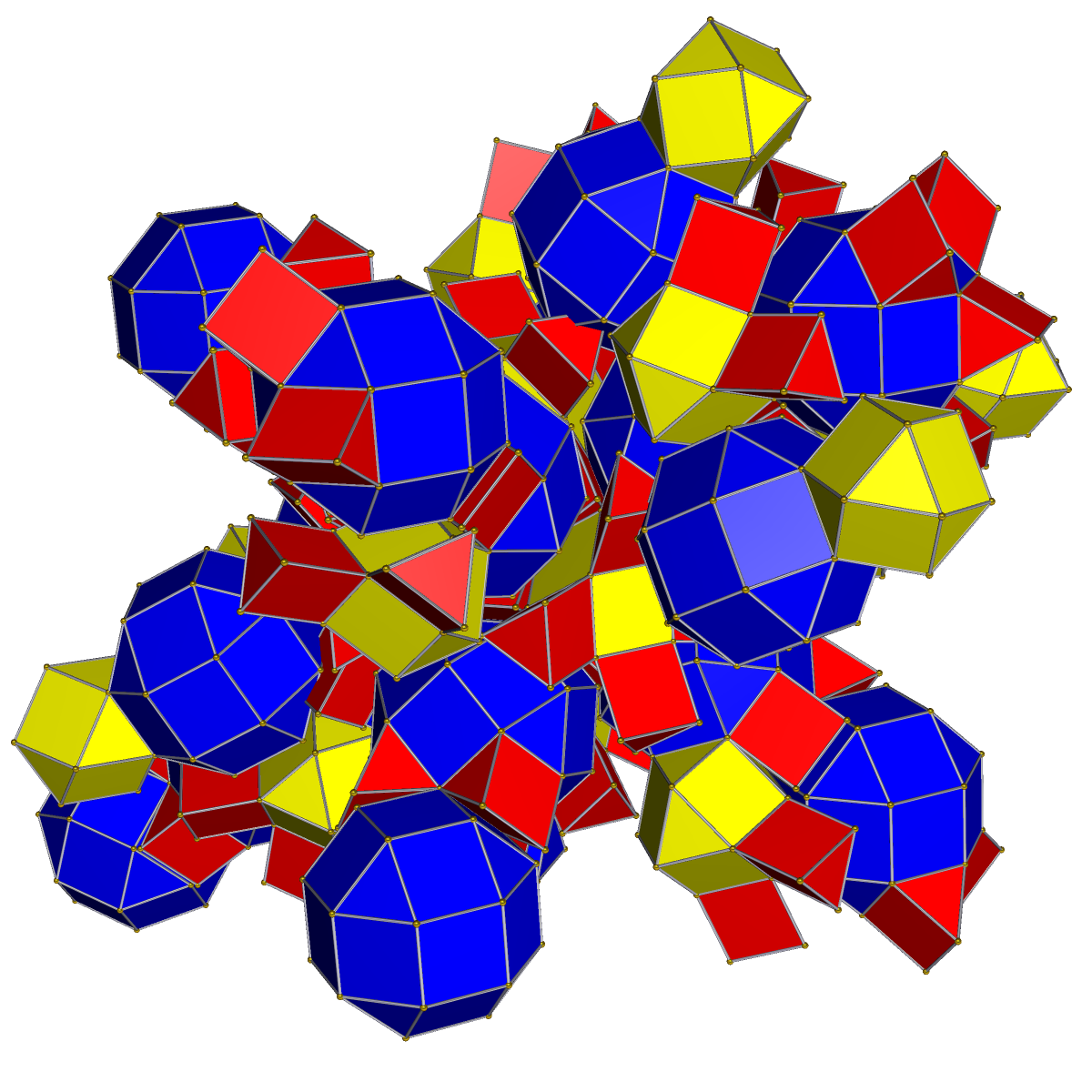
Net

The cantellated 24-cell or small rhombated icositetrachoron is a uniform 4-polytope. Acronym: srico.

The boundary of the cantellated 24-cell is composed of 24 truncated octahedral cells, 24 cuboctahedral cells and 96 triangular prisms. Together they have 288 triangular faces, 432 square faces, 864 edges, and 288 vertices.

=== Construction ===
When the cantellation process is applied to 24-cell, each of the 24 octahedra becomes a small rhombicuboctahedron. In addition however, since each octahedra's edge was previously shared with two other octahedra, the separating edges form the three parallel edges of a triangular prism - 96 triangular prisms, since the 24-cell contains 96 edges. Further, since each vertex was previously shared with 12 faces, the vertex would split into 12 (24*12=288) new vertices. Each group of 12 new vertices forms a cuboctahedron.

=== Coordinates ===
The Cartesian coordinates of the vertices of the cantellated 24-cell having edge length 2 are all permutations of coordinates and sign of:

(0, √2, √2, 2+2√2)
(1, 1+√2, 1+√2, 1+2√2)

The permutations of the second set of coordinates coincide with the vertices of an inscribed runcitruncated tesseract.

The dual configuration has all permutations and signs of:

(0,2,2+√2,2+√2)
(1,1,1+√2,3+√2)

=== Structure ===
The 24 small rhombicuboctahedra are joined to each other via their triangular faces, to the cuboctahedra via their axial square faces, and to the triangular prisms via their off-axial square faces. The cuboctahedra are joined to the triangular prisms via their triangular faces. Each triangular prism is joined to two cuboctahedra at its two ends.

=== Cantic snub 24-cell ===
A half-symmetry construction of the cantellated 24-cell, also called a cantic snub 24-cell, as, has an identical geometry, but its triangular faces are further subdivided. The cantellated 24-cell has 2 positions of triangular faces in ratio of 96 and 192, while the cantic snub 24-cell has 3 positions of 96 triangles.

The difference can be seen in the vertex figures, with edges representing faces in the 4-polytope:

=== Images ===
orthographic projections
Coxeter plane	F_{4}	
Graph		
Dihedral symmetry	[12]	
Coxeter plane	B_{3} / A_{2} (a)	B_{3} / A_{2} (b)
Graph		
Dihedral symmetry	[6]	[6]
Coxeter plane	B_{4}	B_{2} / A_{3}
Graph		
Dihedral symmetry	[8]	[4]

Schlegel diagrams
Schlegel diagram	Showing 24 cuboctahedra.	Showing 96 triangular prisms.

== Related polytopes ==
The convex hull of two cantellated 24-cells in opposite positions is a nonuniform polychoron composed of 864 cells: 48 cuboctahedra, 144 square antiprisms, 384 octahedra (as triangular antipodiums), 288 tetrahedra (as tetragonal disphenoids), and 576 vertices. Its vertex figure is a shape topologically equivalent to a cube with a triangular prism attached to one of its square faces.

== Cantitruncated 24-cell ==
Cantitruncated 24-cell
Schlegel diagram, centered on truncated cuboctahedron
Type	Uniform 4-polytope	
Schläfli symbol	tr{3,4,3}	
Coxeter diagram		
Cells	144	24 4.6.8; 96 4.4.3; 24 3.8.8
Faces	720	192{3} 288{4} 96{6} 144{8}
Edges	1152	
Vertices	576	
Vertex figure	sphenoid	
Symmetry group	F_{4}, [3,4,3], order 1152	
Properties	convex	
Uniform index	27 28 29	

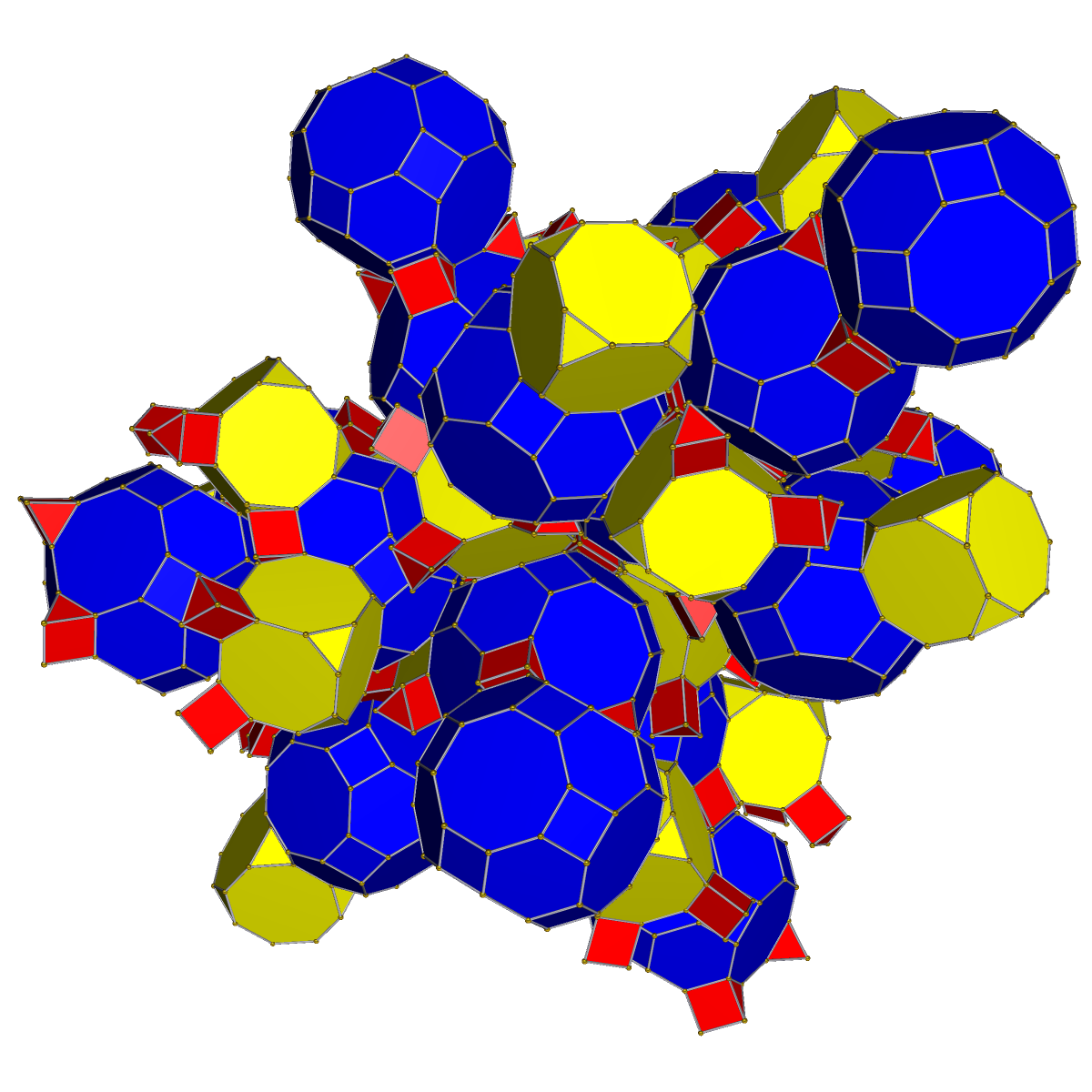
Net

The cantitruncated 24-cell or great rhombated icositetrachoron is a uniform 4-polytope derived from the 24-cell. Acronym: grico.

It is bounded by 24 truncated cuboctahedra corresponding with the cells of a 24-cell, 24 truncated cubes corresponding with the cells of the dual 24-cell, and 96 triangular prisms corresponding with the edges of the first 24-cell.

=== Coordinates ===
The Cartesian coordinates of a cantitruncated 24-cell having edge length 2 are all permutations of coordinates and sign of:

(1,1+√2,1+2√2,3+3√2)
(0,2+√2,2+2√2,2+3√2)

The dual configuration has coordinates as all permutations and signs of:

(1,1+√2,1+√2,5+2√2)
(1,3+√2,3+√2,3+2√2)
(2,2+√2,2+√2,4+2√2)

=== Projections ===
orthographic projections
Coxeter plane	F_{4}	
Graph		
Dihedral symmetry	[12]	
Coxeter plane	B_{3} / A_{2} (a)	B_{3} / A_{2} (b)
Graph		
Dihedral symmetry	[6]	[6]
Coxeter plane	B_{4}	B_{2} / A_{3}
Graph		
Dihedral symmetry	[8]	[4]

Stereographic projection
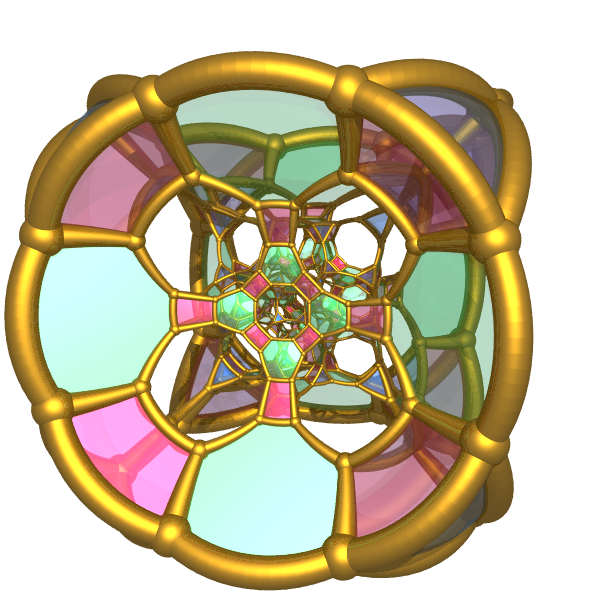

== Related polytopes ==
24-cell family polytopes
Name	24-cell	truncated 24-cell	snub 24-cell	rectified 24-cell	cantellated 24-cell	bitruncated 24-cell	cantitruncated 24-cell	runcinated 24-cell	runcitruncated 24-cell	omnitruncated 24-cell
Schläfli symbol	{3,4,3}	t_{0,1}{3,4,3} t{3,4,3}	s{3,4,3}	t_{1}{3,4,3} r{3,4,3}	t_{0,2}{3,4,3} rr{3,4,3}	t_{1,2}{3,4,3} 2t{3,4,3}	t_{0,1,2}{3,4,3} tr{3,4,3}	t_{0,3}{3,4,3}	t_{0,1,3}{3,4,3}	t_{0,1,2,3}{3,4,3}
Coxeter diagram										
Schlegel diagram										
F_{4}										
B_{4}										
B_{3}(a)										
B_{3}(b)										
B_{2}										

== Notes ==
Fundamental convex regular and uniform polytopes in dimensions 2–10
Family	A_{n}	B_{n}	I_{2}(p) / D_{n}	E_{6} / E_{7} / E_{8} / F_{4} / G_{2}	H_{n}
Regular polygon	Triangle	Square	p-gon	Hexagon	Pentagon
Uniform polyhedron	Tetrahedron	Octahedron • Cube	Demicube		Dodecahedron • Icosahedron
Uniform polychoron	Pentachoron	16-cell • Tesseract	Demitesseract	24-cell	120-cell • 600-cell
Uniform 5-polytope	5-simplex	5-orthoplex • 5-cube	5-demicube		
Uniform 6-polytope	6-simplex	6-orthoplex • 6-cube	6-demicube	1_{22} • 2_{21}	
Uniform 7-polytope	7-simplex	7-orthoplex • 7-cube	7-demicube	1_{32} • 2_{31} • 3_{21}	
Uniform 8-polytope	8-simplex	8-orthoplex • 8-cube	8-demicube	1_{42} • 2_{41} • 4_{21}	
Uniform 9-polytope	9-simplex	9-orthoplex • 9-cube	9-demicube		
Uniform 10-polytope	10-simplex	10-orthoplex • 10-cube	10-demicube		
Uniform n-polytope	n-simplex	n-orthoplex • n-cube	n-demicube	1_{k2} • 2_{k1} • k_{21}	n-pentagonal polytope
Topics: Polytope families • Regular polytope • List of regular polytopes and compounds • Polytope operations
