= Snub 24-cell =

Snub 24-cell
Type	Uniform 4-polytope	
Schläfli symbol	s{3,4,3} sr{3,3,4} s{3^{1,1,1}}	
Coxeter-Dynkin diagrams	or or	
Cells	144	96 3.3.3 (oblique); 24 3.3.3; 24 3.3.3.3.3
Faces	480 {3}	
Edges	432	
Vertices	96	
Vertex figure	(Tridiminished icosahedron)	
Symmetry groups	[3^{+},4,3], 1/2F_{4}, order 576 [(3,3)^{+},4], 1/2B_{4}, order 192 [3^{1,1,1}]^{+}, 1/2D_{4}, order 96	
Dual	Dual snub 24-cell	
Properties	convex	
Uniform index	30 31 32	

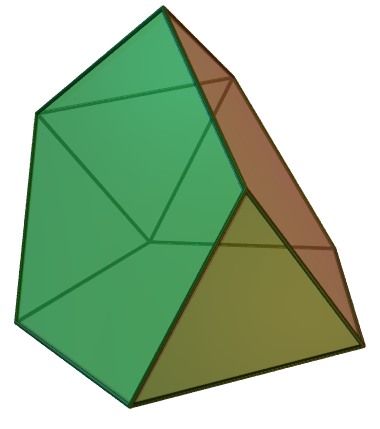
Vertex figure: Tridiminished icosahedron 8 faces: 5 3.3.3 and 3 3.3.3.3.3

In geometry, the snub 24-cell or snub disicositetrachoron is a convex uniform 4-polytope composed of 120 regular tetrahedral and 24 icosahedral cells. Five tetrahedra and three icosahedra meet at each vertex. In total it has 480 triangular faces, 432 edges, and 96 vertices. One can build it from the 600-cell by diminishing a select subset of icosahedral pyramids and leaving only their icosahedral bases, thereby removing 480 tetrahedra and replacing them with 24 icosahedra.

Topologically, under its highest symmetry, [3^{+},4,3], as an alternation of a truncated 24-cell, it contains 24 pyritohedra (an icosahedron with T_{h} symmetry), 24 regular tetrahedra, and 96 triangular pyramids.

== Semiregular polytope ==
It is one of three semiregular 4-polytopes made of two or more cells which are Platonic solids, discovered by Thorold Gosset in his 1900 paper. He called it a tetricosahedric for being made of tetrahedron and icosahedron cells. (The other two are the rectified 5-cell and rectified 600-cell.)

== Alternative names ==
- Snub icositetrachoron
- Snub demitesseract
- Semi-snub polyoctahedron (John Conway)
- Sadi (Jonathan Bowers) for snub disicositetrachoron
- Tetricosahedric (Thorold Gosset)

== Geometry ==
=== Coordinates ===
The vertices of a snub 24-cell centered at the origin of 4-space, with edges of length 2, are obtained by taking even permutations of

(0, ±1, ±φ, ±φ^{2})

where φ = (1+√5)/2 ≈ 1.618 is the golden ratio.

The unit-radius coordinates of the snub 24-cell, with edges of length φ^{−1} ≈ 0.618, are the even permutations of

(±φ/2, ±1/2, ±(φ^{−1})/2, 0)

These 96 vertices can be found by partitioning each of the 96 edges of a 24-cell in the golden ratio in a consistent manner dimensionally analogous to the way the 12 vertices of an icosahedron or "snub octahedron" can be produced by partitioning the 12 edges of an octahedron in the golden ratio. This can be done by first placing vectors along the 24-cell's edges such that each two-dimensional face is bounded by a cycle, then similarly partitioning each edge into the golden ratio along the direction of its vector. This is equivalent to the snub truncation construction of the 24-cell described below.

The 96 vertices of the snub 24-cell, together with the 24 vertices of a 24-cell, form the 120 vertices of the 600-cell.

=== Constructions ===
The snub 24-cell is derived from the 24-cell by a special form of truncation.

Truncations remove vertices by cutting through the edges incident to the vertex; forms of truncation differ by where on the edge the cut is made. The common truncations of the 24-cell include the rectified 24-cell (which cuts each edge at its midpoint, producing a polytope bounded by 24 cubes and 24 cuboctahedra), and the truncated 24-cell (which cuts each edge one-third of its length from the vertex, producing a polytope bounded by 24 cubes and 24 truncated octahedra). In these truncations a cube is produced in place of the removed vertex, because the vertex figure of the 24-cell is a cube and the cuts are equidistant from the vertex.

The snub truncation of the 24-cell cuts each edge into two golden sections (such that the larger section is in the golden ratio ~1.618 to the smaller section, and the original edge is in the golden ratio to the larger section). The cut must be made in alternate directions on alternate edges incident to each vertex, in order to have a coherent result. The edges incident to a vertex in the 24-cell are the 8 radii of its cubical vertex figure. The only way to choose alternate radii of a cube is to choose the four radii of a tetrahedron (inscribed in the cube) to be cut at the smaller section of their length from the vertex, and the opposite four radii (of the other tetrahedron that can be inscribed in the cube) to be cut at the larger section of their length from the vertex. There are of course two ways to do this; both produce a cluster of five regular tetrahedra in place of the removed vertex, rather than a cube.

This construction has an analogy in 3 dimensions: the construction of the icosahedron (the "snub octahedron") from the octahedron, by the same method. That is how the snub-24 cell's icosahedra are produced from the 24-cell's octahedra during truncation.

The snub 24-cell is related to the truncated 24-cell by an alternation operation. Half the vertices are deleted, the 24 truncated octahedron cells become 24 icosahedron cells, the 24 cubes become 24 tetrahedron cells, and the 96 deleted vertex voids create 96 new tetrahedron cells.

Orthogonal projection, F_{4} Coxeter plane
Snub 24-cell	600-cell

The snub 24-cell may also be constructed by a particular diminishing of the 600-cell: by removing 24 vertices from the 600-cell corresponding to those of an inscribed 24-cell, and then taking the convex hull of the remaining vertices. This is equivalent to removing 24 icosahedral pyramids from the 600-cell.

Conversely, the 600-cell may be constructed from the snub 24-cell by augmenting it with 24 icosahedral pyramids.

=== Weyl orbits ===
Another construction method uses quaternions and the Icosahedral symmetry of Weyl group orbits $O(\Lambda)=W(H_4)=I$ of order 120. The following describe $T$ and $T'$ 24-cells as quaternion orbit weights of D4 under the Weyl group W(D4):

O(0100) : T = {±1,±e1,±e2,±e3,(±1±e1±e2±e3)/2}
O(1000) : V1
O(0010) : V2
O(0001) : V3

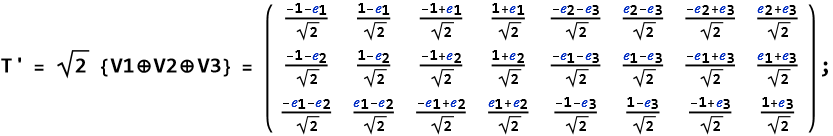

With quaternions $(p,q)$ where $\bar p$ is the conjugate of $p$ and $[p,q]:r\rightarrow r'=prq$ and $[p,q]^*:r\rightarrow r''=p\bar rq$, then the Coxeter group $W(H_4)=\lbrace[p,\bar p] \oplus [p,\bar p]^*\rbrace$ is the symmetry group of the 600-cell and the 120-cell of order 14400.

Given $p \in T$ such that $\bar p=\pm p^4, \bar p^2=\pm p^3, \bar p^3=\pm p^2, \bar p^4=\pm p$ and $p^\dagger$ as an exchange of $-1/\varphi \leftrightarrow \varphi$ within $p$, we can construct the snub 24-cell as $S=\sum_{i=1}^4\oplus p^i T$

=== Structure ===
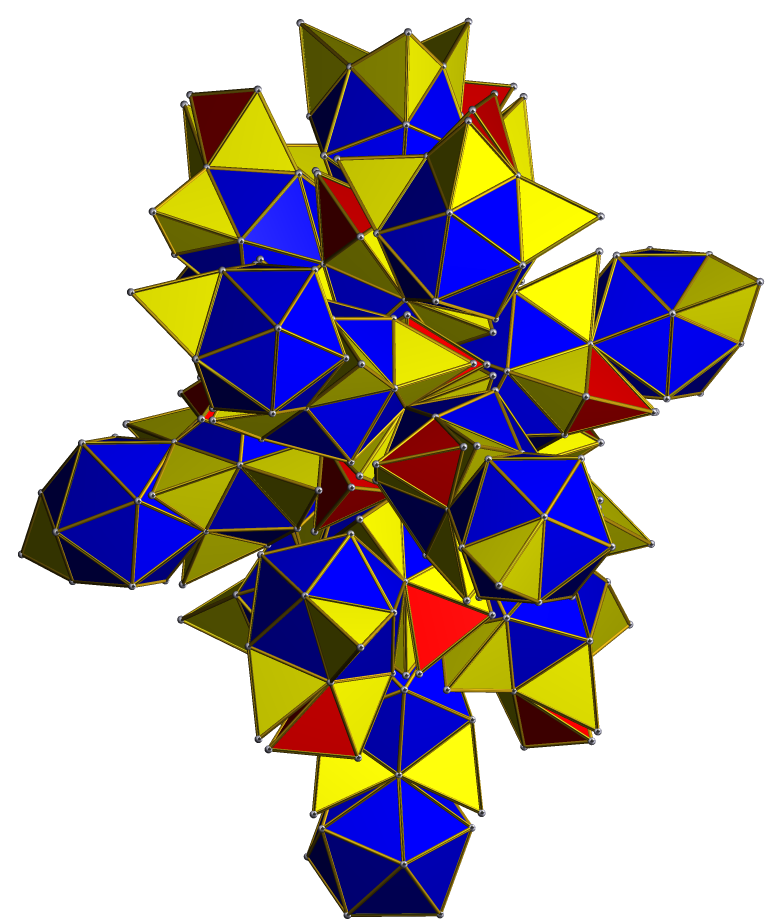
A net of the snub 24-cell with blue icosahedra, and red and yellow tetrahedra.

The icosahedral cells fit together face-to-face leaving voids between them filled by clusters of five tetrahedral cells.

Each icosahedral cell is joined to 8 other icosahedral cells at 8 triangular faces in the positions corresponding to an inscribing octahedron. The remaining triangular faces are joined to tetrahedral cells, which occur in pairs that share an edge on the icosahedral cell.

The tetrahedral cells may be divided into two groups, of 96 yellow cells and 24 red cells respectively (as colored in the net illustration). Each yellow tetrahedral cell is joined via its triangular faces to 3 blue icosahedral cells and one red tetrahedral cell, while each red tetrahedral cell is joined to 4 yellow tetrahedra. Thus, the tetrahedral cells occur in clusters of five (four yellow cells face-bonded around a red central one, each red/yellow pair lying in a different hyperplane). The red central tetrahedron of the five shares each of its six edges with a different icosahedral cell, and with the pair of yellow tetrahedral cells which shares that edge on the icosahedral cell.

=== Symmetry ===
The snub 24-cell has three vertex-transitive colorings based on a Wythoff construction on a Coxeter group from which it is alternated: F_{4} defines 24 interchangeable icosahedra, while the B_{4} group defines two groups of icosahedra in an 8:16 counts, and finally the D_{4} group has 3 groups of icosahedra with 8:8:8 counts.

Symmetry (order)	Constructive name	Coxeter-Dynkin diagram Extended Schläfli symbol	Vertex figure (Tridiminished icosahedron)	Cells (Colored as faces in vertex figures)
1/2F_{4} [3^{+},4,3] (576)	Snub 24-cell	s{3,4,3}		One set of 24 icosahedra (blue); Two sets of tetrahedra: 96 (yellow) and 24 (cyan)
1/2B_{4} [(3,3)^{+},4] (192)	Snub rectified 16-cell	sr{3,3,4}		Two sets icosahedra: 8, 16 each (red and blue); Two sets of tetrahedra: 96 (yellow) and 24 (cyan)
1/2D_{4} [3^{1,1,1}]^{+} (96)	Omnisnub demitesseract	s{3^{1,1,1}}		Three sets of 8 icosahedra (red, green, and blue); Two sets of tetrahedra: 96 (yellow) and 24 (cyan)

== Projections ==
=== Orthographic projections ===
orthographic projections
Coxeter plane	F_{4}	B_{4}
Graph		
Dihedral symmetry	[12]^{+}	[8/2]
Coxeter plane	D_{4} / B_{3} / A_{2}	B_{2} / A_{3}
Graph		
Dihedral symmetry	[6]^{+}	[4]

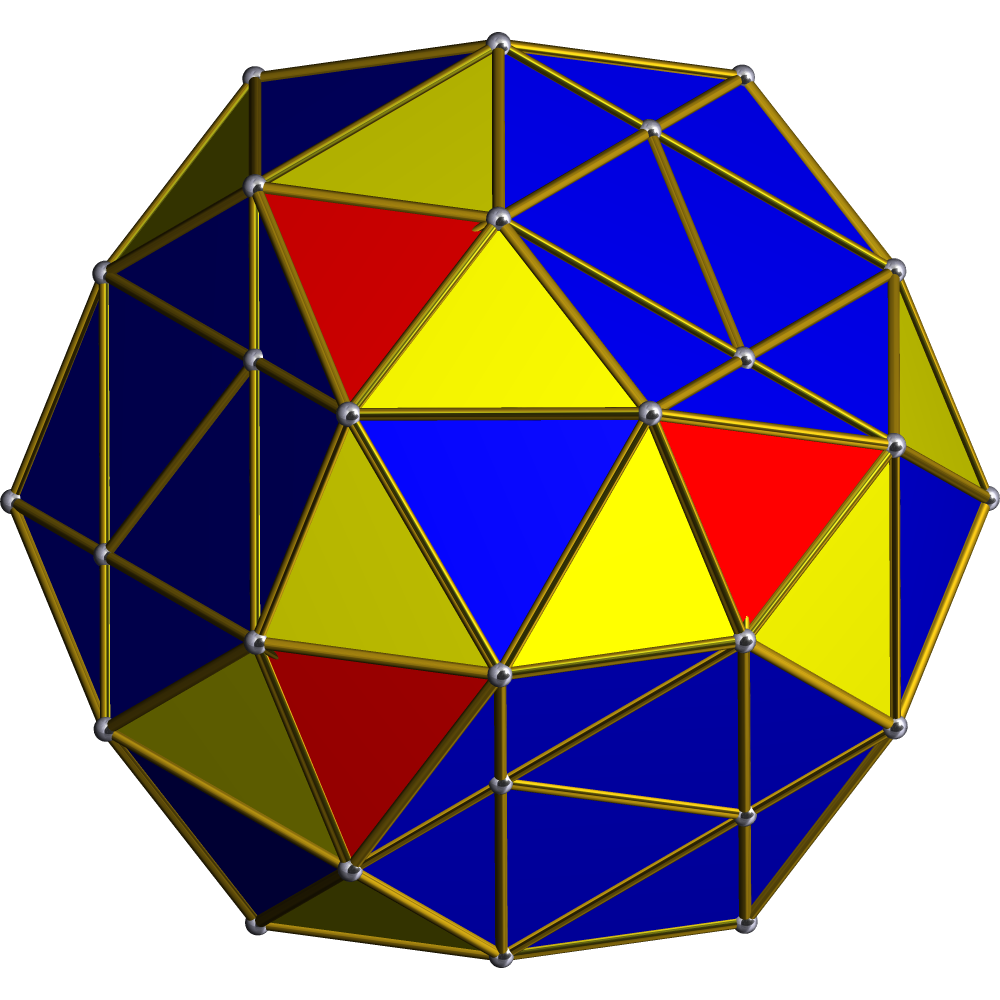
Orthogonal projection
Centered on hyperplane of one icosahedron.

=== Perspective projections ===
Perspective projections
Perspective projection centered on an icosahedral cell, with 4D viewpoint placed at a distance of 5 times the vertex-center radius. The nearest icosahedral cell is rendered in solid color, and the other cells are in edge-outline. Cells facing away from the 4D viewpoint are culled, to reduce visual clutter.	The same projection, now with 4 of the 8 icosahedral cells surrounding the central cell shown in green.
The same projection as above, now with the other 4 icosahedral cells surrounding the central cell shown in magenta. The animated version of this image gives a good view on the layout of these cells. From this particular viewpoint, one of the gaps containing tetrahedral cells can be seen. Each of these gaps are filled by 5 tetrahedral cells, not shown here.	Same projection as above, now with the central tetrahedral cell in the gap filled in. This tetrahedral cell is joined to 4 other tetrahedral cells, two of which fills the two gaps visible in this image. The other two each lies between a green tetrahedral cell, a magenta cell, and the central cell, to the left and right of the yellow tetrahedral cell. Note that in these images, cells facing away from the 4D viewpoint have been culled; hence there are only a total of 1 + 8 + 6 + 24 = 39 cells accounted for here. The other cells lie on the other side of the snub 24-cell. Part of the edge outline of one of them, an icosahedral cell, can be discerned here, overlying the yellow tetrahedron.
In this image, only the nearest icosahedral cell and the 6 yellow tetrahedral cells from the previous image are shown.	Now the 12 tetrahedral cells joined to the central icosahedral cell and the 6 yellow tetrahedral cells are shown. Each of these cells is surrounded by the central icosahedron and two of the other icosahedral cells shown earlier.
Finally, the other 12 tetrahedral cells joined to the 6 yellow tetrahedral cells are shown here. These cells, together with the 8 icosahedral cells shown earlier, comprise all the cells that share at least 1 vertex with the central cell.

== Dual ==
The Dual snub 24-cell has 144 identical irregular cells. Each cell has faces of two kinds: 3 kites and 6 isosceles triangles. The polytope has a total of 432 faces (144 kites and 288 isosceles triangles) and 480 edges.

== Related polytopes ==
The snub 24-cell can be obtained as a diminishing of the 600-cell at 24 of its vertices, in fact those of a vertex inscribed 24-cell. There is also a further such bi-diminishing, when the vertices of a second vertex inscribed 24-cell would be diminished as well. Accordingly, this one is known as the bi-24-diminished 600-cell.

D_{4} uniform polychora (red index on Coxeter-Dynkin diagram indicates Wythoff operation table row number)
1  folding:	triality: 2  3  4	triality: 5  6  7	triality: 8  9  10	triality: 11  12  13	14  folding:	15  folding:	16  folding:
r{3,3^{1,1}} {3^{1,1,1}}={3,4,3}	{3,3^{1,1}} h{4,3,3}	t{3,3^{1,1}} h_{2}{4,3,3}	2r{3,3^{1,1}} h_{3}{4,3,3}	2t{3,3^{1,1}} h_{2,3}{4,3,3}	rr{3,3^{1,1}} r{3^{1,1,1}}=r{3,4,3}	tr{3,3^{1,1}} t{3^{1,1,1}}=t{3,4,3}	sr{3,3^{1,1}} s{3^{1,1,1}}=s{3,4,3}

The snub 24-cell is also called a semi-snub 24-cell because it is not a true snub (alternation of an omnitruncated 24-cell). The full snub 24-cell can also be constructed although it is not uniform, being composed of irregular tetrahedra on the alternated vertices.

The snub 24-cell is the largest facet of the 4-dimensional honeycomb, the snub 24-cell honeycomb.

The snub 24-cell is a part of the F_{4} symmetry family of uniform 4-polytopes.

24-cell family polytopes
Name	24-cell	truncated 24-cell	snub 24-cell	rectified 24-cell	cantellated 24-cell	bitruncated 24-cell	cantitruncated 24-cell	runcinated 24-cell	runcitruncated 24-cell	omnitruncated 24-cell
Schläfli symbol	{3,4,3}	t_{0,1}{3,4,3} t{3,4,3}	s{3,4,3}	t_{1}{3,4,3} r{3,4,3}	t_{0,2}{3,4,3} rr{3,4,3}	t_{1,2}{3,4,3} 2t{3,4,3}	t_{0,1,2}{3,4,3} tr{3,4,3}	t_{0,3}{3,4,3}	t_{0,1,3}{3,4,3}	t_{0,1,2,3}{3,4,3}
Coxeter diagram										
Schlegel diagram										
F_{4}										
B_{4}										
B_{3}(a)										
B_{3}(b)										
B_{2}										

== See also ==
- Snub 24-cell honeycomb
- Dual snub 24-cell

== Citations ==
Fundamental convex regular and uniform polytopes
Family	A_{n}	B_{n}	I_{2}(p) / D_{n}	E_{6} / E_{7} / E_{8} / F_{4} / G_{2}	H_{n}
Regular polygon	Triangle	Square	p-gon	Hexagon	Pentagon
Uniform polyhedron	Tetrahedron	Octahedron • Cube	Demicube		Dodecahedron • Icosahedron
Uniform polychoron	Pentachoron	16-cell • Tesseract	Demitesseract	24-cell	120-cell • 600-cell
Uniform 5-polytope	5-simplex	5-orthoplex • 5-cube	5-demicube		
Uniform 6-polytope	6-simplex	6-orthoplex • 6-cube	6-demicube	1_{22} • 2_{21}	
Uniform 7-polytope	7-simplex	7-orthoplex • 7-cube	7-demicube	1_{32} • 2_{31} • 3_{21}	
Uniform 8-polytope	8-simplex	8-orthoplex • 8-cube	8-demicube	1_{42} • 2_{41} • 4_{21}	
Uniform n-polytope	n-simplex	n-orthoplex • n-cube	n-demicube	1_{k2} • 2_{k1} • k_{21}	n-pentagonal polytope
Topics: Polytope families • Regular polytope • List of regular polytopes and compounds • Polytope operations
