= Runcination =

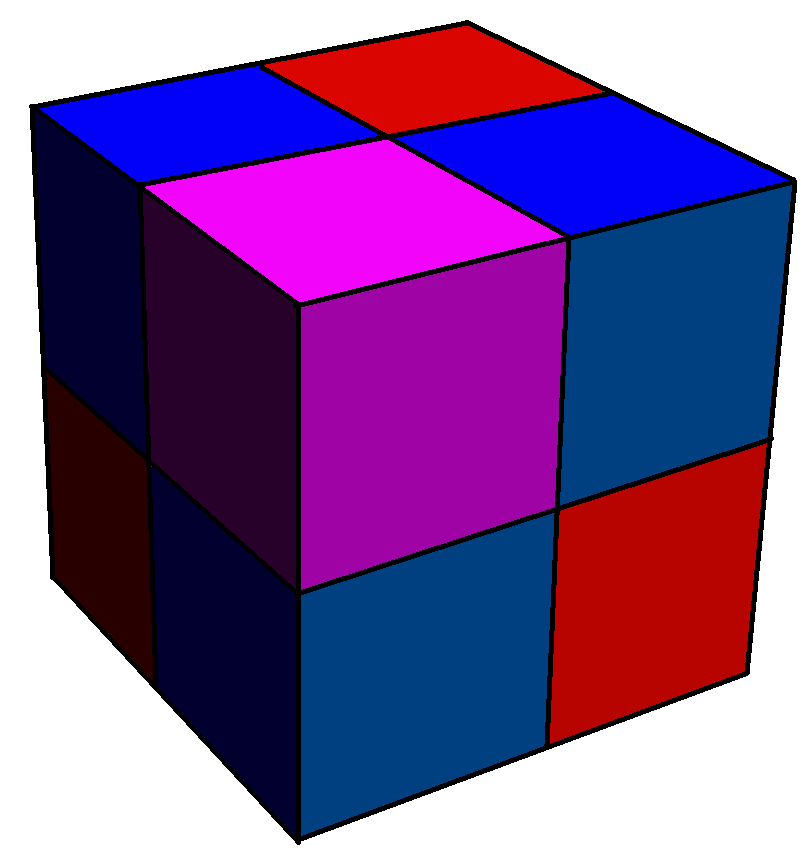
A runcinated cubic honeycomb (partial) - The original cells (purple cubes) are reduced in size. Faces become new blue cubic cells. Edges become new red cubic cells. Vertices become new cubic cells (hidden).

In geometry, runcination is an operation that cuts a regular polytope (or honeycomb) simultaneously along the faces, edges, and vertices, creating new facets in place of the original face, edge, and vertex centers.

It is a higher-order truncation operation, following cantellation and truncation.

It is represented by an extended Schläfli symbol t_{0,3}{p,q,...}. This operation only exists for 4-polytopes {p,q,r} or higher.

This operation is dual-symmetric for regular uniform 4-polytopes and 3-space convex uniform honeycombs.

For a regular {p,q,r} 4-polytope, the original {p,q} cells remain, but become separated. The gaps at the separated faces become p-gonal prisms. The gaps between the separated edges become r-gonal prisms. The gaps between the separated vertices become {r,q} cells. The vertex figure for a regular 4-polytope {p,q,r} is an q-gonal antiprism (called an antipodium if p and r are different).

For regular 4-polytopes/honeycombs, this operation is also called expansion by Alicia Boole Stott, as imagined by moving the cells of the regular form away from the center, and filling in new faces in the gaps for each opened vertex and edge.

Runcinated 4-polytopes/honeycombs forms:

Schläfli symbol Coxeter diagram	Name	Vertex figure	Image
Uniform 4-polytopes
t_{0,3}{3,3,3}	Runcinated 5-cell		
t_{0,3}{3,3,4}	Runcinated 16-cell (Same as runcinated 8-cell)		
t_{0,3}{3,4,3}	Runcinated 24-cell		
t_{0,3}{3,3,5}	Runcinated 120-cell (Same as runcinated 600-cell)		
Euclidean convex uniform honeycombs
t_{0,3}{4,3,4}	Runcinated cubic honeycomb (Same as cubic honeycomb)		
Hyperbolic uniform honeycombs
t_{0,3}{4,3,5}	Runcinated order-5 cubic honeycomb		
t_{0,3}{3,5,3}	Runcinated icosahedral honeycomb		
t_{0,3}{5,3,5}	Runcinated order-5 dodecahedral honeycomb		

== See also ==
- Uniform polyhedron
- Uniform 4-polytope
- Rectification (geometry)
- Truncation (geometry)
- Cantellation (geometry)
