= Truncated 24-cells =

24-cell	Truncated 24-cell	Bitruncated 24-cell
Schlegel diagrams centered on one [3,4] (cells at opposite at [4,3])

In geometry, a truncated 24-cell is a uniform 4-polytope (4-dimensional uniform polytope) formed as the truncation of the regular 24-cell.

There are two degrees of truncations, including a bitruncation.

== Truncated 24-cell ==
Schlegel diagram
Truncated 24-cell
Type	Uniform 4-polytope	
Schläfli symbols	t{3,4,3} tr{3,3,4}=$t\left\{\begin{array}{l}3\\3,4\end{array}\right\}$ t{3^{1,1,1}} = $t\left\{\begin{array}{l}3\\3\\3\end{array}\right\}$	
Coxeter diagram		
Cells	48	24 4.6.6; 24 4.4.4
Faces	240	144 {4} 96 {6}
Edges	384	
Vertices	192	
Vertex figure	equilateral triangular pyramid	
Symmetry group	F_{4} [3,4,3], order 1152	
Rotation subgroup	[3,4,3]^{+}, order 576	
Commutator subgroup	[3^{+},4,3^{+}], order 288	
Properties	convex	
Uniform index	23 24 25	

The truncated 24-cell or truncated icositetrachoron is a uniform 4-dimensional polytope (or uniform 4-polytope), which is bounded by 48 cells: 24 cubes, and 24 truncated octahedra. Each vertex joins three truncated octahedra and one cube, in an equilateral triangular pyramid vertex figure.

=== Construction ===
The truncated 24-cell can be constructed from polytopes with three symmetry groups:

- F_{4} [3,4,3]: A truncation of the 24-cell.
- B_{4} [3,3,4]: A cantitruncation of the 16-cell, with two families of truncated octahedral cells.
- D_{4} [3^{1,1,1}]: An omnitruncation of the demitesseract, with three families of truncated octahedral cells.

Coxeter group	${F}_4$ = [3,4,3]	${C}_4$ = [4,3,3]	${D}_4$ = [3,3^{1,1}]
Schläfli symbol	t{3,4,3}	tr{3,3,4}	t{3^{1,1,1}}
Order	1152	384	192
Full symmetry group	[3,4,3]	[4,3,3]	<[3,3^{1,1}]> = [4,3,3] [3[3^{1,1,1}]] = [3,4,3]
Coxeter diagram			
Facets	3: 1:	2: 1: 1:	1,1,1: 1:
Vertex figure			

=== Zonotope ===
It is also a zonotope: it can be formed as the Minkowski sum of the six line segments connecting opposite pairs among the twelve permutations of the vector (+1,−1,0,0).

=== Cartesian coordinates ===
The Cartesian coordinates of the vertices of a truncated 24-cell having edge length sqrt(2) are all coordinate permutations and sign combinations of:

(0,1,2,3) [4!×2^{3} = 192 vertices]

The dual configuration has coordinates at all coordinate permutation and signs of

(1,1,1,5) [4×2^{4} = 64 vertices]
(1,3,3,3) [4×2^{4} = 64 vertices]
(2,2,2,4) [4×2^{4} = 64 vertices]

=== Structure ===
The 24 cubical cells are joined via their square faces to the truncated octahedra; and the 24 truncated octahedra are joined to each other via their hexagonal faces.

=== Projections ===
The parallel projection of the truncated 24-cell into 3-dimensional space, truncated octahedron first, has the following layout:

- The projection envelope is a truncated cuboctahedron.
- Two of the truncated octahedra project onto a truncated octahedron lying in the center of the envelope.
- Six cuboidal volumes join the square faces of this central truncated octahedron to the center of the octagonal faces of the great rhombicuboctahedron. These are the images of 12 of the cubical cells, a pair of cells to each image.
- The 12 square faces of the great rhombicuboctahedron are the images of the remaining 12 cubes.
- The 6 octagonal faces of the great rhombicuboctahedron are the images of 6 of the truncated octahedra.
- The 8 (non-uniform) truncated octahedral volumes lying between the hexagonal faces of the projection envelope and the central truncated octahedron are the images of the remaining 16 truncated octahedra, a pair of cells to each image.

=== Images ===
orthographic projections
Coxeter plane	F_{4}	
Graph		
Dihedral symmetry	[12]	
Coxeter plane	B_{3} / A_{2} (a)	B_{3} / A_{2} (b)
Graph		
Dihedral symmetry	[6]	[6]
Coxeter plane	B_{4}	B_{2} / A_{3}
Graph		
Dihedral symmetry	[8]	[4]

Schlegel diagram (cubic cells visible)	Schlegel diagram 8 of 24 truncated octahedral cells visible
Stereographic projection Centered on truncated tetrahedron

Nets
Truncated 24-cell	Dual to truncated 24-cell

=== Related polytopes ===
The convex hull of the truncated 24-cell and its dual (assuming that they are congruent) is a nonuniform polychoron composed of 480 cells: 48 cubes, 144 square antiprisms, 288 tetrahedra (as tetragonal disphenoids), and 384 vertices. Its vertex figure is a hexakis triangular cupola.

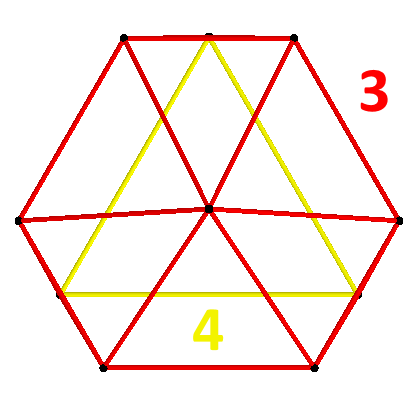
Vertex figure

== Bitruncated 24-cell ==
Bitruncated 24-cell
Schlegel diagram, centered on truncated cube, with alternate cells hidden
Type	Uniform 4-polytope	
Schläfli symbol	2t{3,4,3}	
Coxeter diagram		
Cells	48 (3.8.8)	
Faces	336	192 {3} 144 {8}
Edges	576	
Vertices	288	
Edge figure	3.8.8	
Vertex figure	tetragonal disphenoid	
dual polytope	Disphenoidal 288-cell	
Symmetry group	Aut(F_{4}), [[3,4,3]], order 2304	
Properties	convex, isogonal, isotoxal, isochoric	
Uniform index	26 27 28	

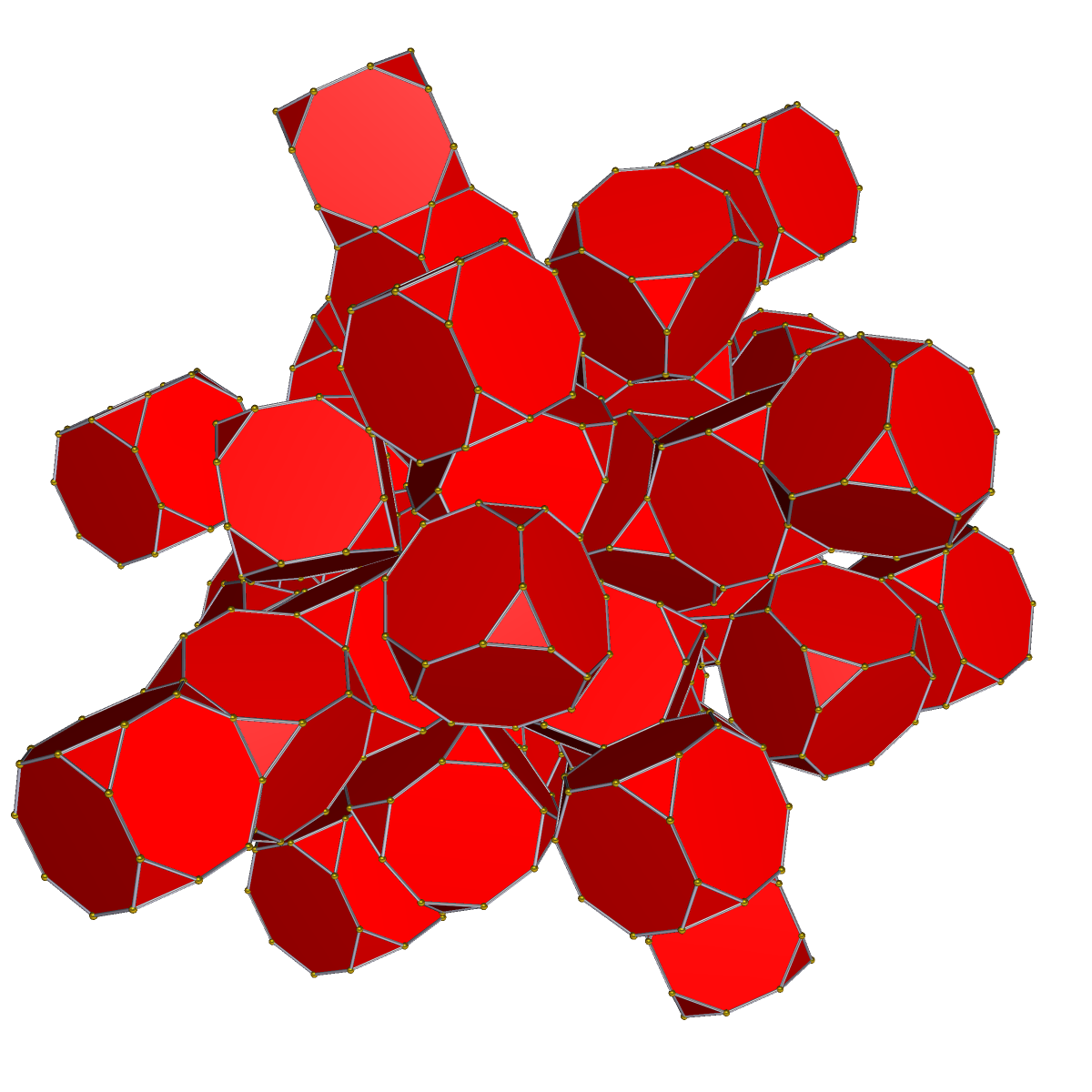
Net

The bitruncated 24-cell. 48-cell, or tetracontoctachoron is a 4-dimensional uniform polytope (or uniform 4-polytope) derived from the 24-cell.

E. L. Elte identified it in 1912 as a semiregular polytope.

It is constructed by bitruncating the 24-cell (truncating at halfway to the depth which would yield the dual 24-cell).

Being a uniform 4-polytope, it is vertex-transitive. In addition, it is cell-transitive, consisting of 48 truncated cubes, and also edge-transitive, with 3 truncated cubes cells per edge and with one triangle and two octagons around each edge.

The 48 cells of the bitruncated 24-cell correspond with the 24 cells and 24 vertices of the 24-cell. As such, the centers of the 48 cells form the root system of type F_{4}.

Its vertex figure is a tetragonal disphenoid, a tetrahedron with 2 opposite edges length 1 and all 4 lateral edges length √(2+√2).

=== Alternative names ===
- Bitruncated 24-cell (Norman W. Johnson)
- 48-cell as a cell-transitive 4-polytope
- Bitruncated icositetrachoron
- Bitruncated polyoctahedron
- Tetracontaoctachoron (Cont) (Jonathan Bowers)

=== Structure ===
The truncated cubes are joined to each other via their octagonal faces in anti orientation; i. e., two adjoining truncated cubes are rotated 45 degrees relative to each other so that no two triangular faces share an edge.

The sequence of truncated cubes joined to each other via opposite octagonal faces form a cycle of 8. Each truncated cube belongs to 3 such cycles. On the other hand, the sequence of truncated cubes joined to each other via opposite triangular faces form a cycle of 6. Each truncated cube belongs to 4 such cycles.

Seen in a configuration matrix, all incidence counts between elements are shown. The diagonal f-vector numbers are derived through the Wythoff construction, dividing the full group order of a subgroup order by removing one mirror at a time. Edges exist at 4 symmetry positions. Squares exist at 3 positions, hexagons 2 positions, and octagons one. Finally the 4 types of cells exist centered on the 4 corners of the fundamental simplex.

F_{4}	k-face	f_{k}	f_{0}	f_{1}		f_{2}			f_{3}		k-figure	Notes
A_{1}A_{1}	( )	f_{0}	288	2	2	1	4	1	2	2	s{2,4}	F_{4}/A_{1}A_{1} = 288
A_{1}A_{1}	{ }	f_{1}	2	288	*	1	2	0	2	1	{ }v( )	F_{4}/A_{1}A_{1} = 288
A_{1}A_{1}	{ }	f_{1}	2	*	288	0	2	1	1	2	{ }v( )	F_{4}/A_{1}A_{1} = 288
A_{2}A_{1}	{3}	f_{2}	3	3	0	96	*	*	2	0	{ }	F_{4}/A_{2}A_{1} = 1152/6/2 = 96
B_{2}	t{4}	f_{2}	8	4	4	*	144	*	1	1	{ }	F_{4}/B_{2} = 1152/8 = 144
A_{2}A_{1}	{3}	f_{2}	3	0	3	*	*	96	0	2	{ }	F_{4}/A_{2}A_{1} = 1152/6/2 = 96
B_{3}	t{4,3}	f_{3}	24	24	12	8	6	0	24	*	( )	F_{4}/B_{3} = 1152/48 = 24
B_{3}	t{4,3}	f_{3}	24	12	24	0	6	8	*	24	( )	F_{4}/B_{3} = 1152/48 = 24

=== Coordinates ===
The Cartesian coordinates of a bitruncated 24-cell having edge length 2 are all permutations of coordinates and sign of:

(0, 2+√2, 2+√2, 2+2√2)
(1, 1+√2, 1+√2, 3+2√2)

=== Projections ===
==== Projection to 2 dimensions ====
orthographic projections
Coxeter plane	F_{4}	B_{4}
Graph		
Dihedral symmetry	[[12]] = [24]	[8]
Coxeter plane	B_{3} / A_{2}	B_{2} / A_{3}
Graph		
Dihedral symmetry	[6]	[[4]] = [8]

==== Projection to 3 dimensions ====
Orthographic	Perspective
The following animation shows the orthographic projection of the bitruncated 24-cell into 3 dimensions. The animation itself is a perspective projection from the static 3D image into 2D, with rotation added to make its structure more apparent. The images of the 48 truncated cubes are laid out as follows: The central truncated cube is the cell closest to the 4D viewpoint, highlighted to make it easier to see. To reduce visual clutter, the vertices and edges that lie on this central truncated cube have been omitted.; Surrounding this central truncated cube are 6 truncated cubes attached via the octagonal faces, and 8 truncated cubes attached via the triangular faces. These cells have been made transparent so that the central cell is visible.; The 6 outer square faces of the projection envelope are the images of another 6 truncated cubes, and the 12 oblong octagonal faces of the projection envelope are the images of yet another 12 truncated cubes.; The remaining cells have been culled because they lie on the far side the bitruncated 24-cell, and are obscured from the 4D viewpoint. These include the antipodal truncated cube, which would have projected to the same volume as the highlighted truncated cube, with 6 other truncated cubes surrounding it attached via octagonal faces, and 8 other truncated cubes surrounding it attached via triangular faces.	The following animation shows the cell-first perspective projection of the bitruncated 24-cell into 3 dimensions. Its structure is the same as the previous animation, except that there is some foreshortening due to the perspective projection.

Stereographic projection
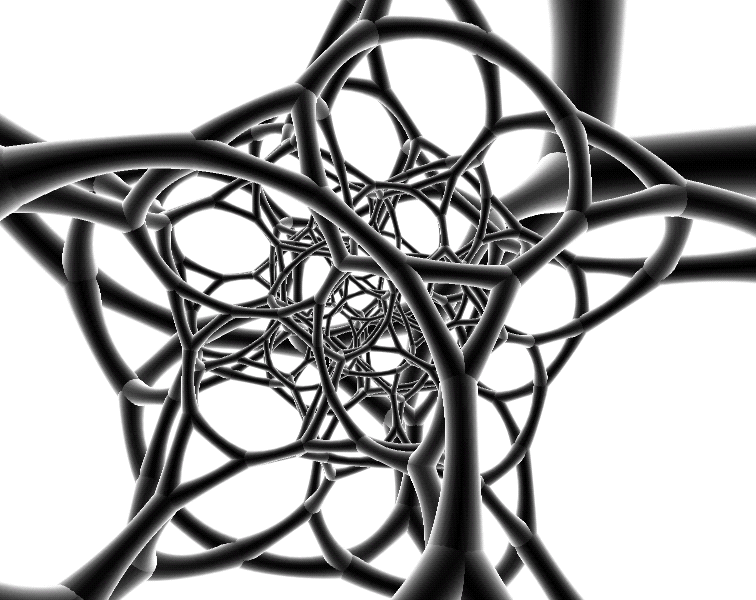

=== Related regular skew polyhedron ===
The regular skew polyhedron {8,4|3} exists in 4-space with 4 octagons around each vertex, in a zig-zagging nonplanar vertex figure. These octagonal faces can be seen on the bitruncated 24-cell, using all 576 edges and 288 vertices. The 192 triangular faces of the bitruncated 24-cell can be seen as removed. The dual regular skew polyhedron, {4,8|3}, is similarly related to the square faces of the runcinated 24-cell.

=== Disphenoidal 288-cell ===
Disphenoidal 288-cell
Type	perfect polychoron	
Symbol	f_{1,2}F_{4} (1,0,0,0)_{F_{4}} ⊕ (0,0,0,1)_{F_{4}}	
Coxeter		
Cells	288 congruent tetragonal disphenoids	
Faces	576 congruent isosceles (2 short edges)	
Edges	336	192 of length $\scriptstyle 1$ 144 of length $\scriptstyle \sqrt{2-\sqrt2}$
Vertices	48	
Vertex figure	(Triakis octahedron)	
Dual	Bitruncated 24-cell	
Coxeter group	Aut(F_{4}), [[3,4,3]], order 2304	
Orbit vector	(1, 2, 1, 1)	
Properties	convex, isochoric	

The disphenoidal 288-cell is the dual of the bitruncated 24-cell. It is a 4-dimensional polytope (or polychoron) derived from the 24-cell. It is constructed by doubling and rotating the 24-cell, then constructing the convex hull.

Being the dual of a uniform polychoron, it is cell-transitive, consisting of 288 congruent tetragonal disphenoids. In addition, it is vertex-transitive under the group Aut(F_{4}).

==== Images ====
Orthogonal projections
Coxeter planes	B_{2}	B_{3}	F_{4}
Disphenoidal 288-cell			
Bitruncated 24-cell			

==== Geometry ====
The vertices of the 288-cell are precisely the 24 Hurwitz unit quaternions with norm squared 1, united with the 24 vertices of the dual 24-cell with norm squared 2, projected to the unit 3-sphere. These 48 vertices correspond to the binary octahedral group 2O or <2,3,4>, order 48.

Thus, the 288-cell is the only non-regular 4-polytope which is the convex hull of a quaternionic group, disregarding the infinitely many dicyclic (same as binary dihedral) groups; the regular ones are the 24-cell (≘ 2T or <2,3,3>, order 24) and the 600-cell (≘ 2I or <2,3,5>, order 120). (The 16-cell corresponds to the binary dihedral group 2D_{2} or <2,2,2>, order 16.)

The inscribed 3-sphere has radius 1/2+√2/4 ≈ 0.853553 and touches the 288-cell at the centers of the 288 tetrahedra which are the vertices of the dual bitruncated 24-cell.

The vertices can be coloured in 2 colours, say red and yellow, with the 24 Hurwitz units in red and the 24 duals in yellow, the yellow 24-cell being congruent to the red one. Thus the product of 2 equally coloured quaternions is red and the product of 2 in mixed colours is yellow.

Region	Layer	Latitude	red		yellow	
Northern hemisphere	3	1	1	$1$	0	
Northern hemisphere	2	√2/2	0		6	$\tfrac{\sqrt{2}}{2}\{ \;\;\; 1\pm\mathrm{i}, \;\;\; 1\pm\mathrm{j}, \;\;\; 1\pm\mathrm{k}\}$
Northern hemisphere	1	1/2	8	$\tfrac{1}{2}\{1\pm\mathrm{i}\pm\mathrm{j}\pm\mathrm{k}\}$	0	
Equator	0	0	6	$\{ \pm\mathrm{i},\pm\mathrm{j},\pm\mathrm{k} \}$	12	$\tfrac{\sqrt{2}}{2}\{\,\pm\mathrm{i}\pm\mathrm{j},\,\pm\mathrm{i}\pm\mathrm{k},\,\pm\mathrm{j}\pm\mathrm{k}\}$
Southern hemisphere	–1	–1/2	8	$-\tfrac{1}{2}\{1\pm\mathrm{i}\pm\mathrm{j}\pm\mathrm{k}\}$	0	
Southern hemisphere	–2	–√2/2	0		6	$\tfrac{\sqrt{2}}{2}\{-1\pm\mathrm{i},-1\pm\mathrm{j},-1\pm\mathrm{k}\}$
Southern hemisphere	–3	–1	1	$-1$	0	
Total			24		24	

Placing a fixed red vertex at the north pole (1,0,0,0), there are 6 yellow vertices in the next deeper “latitude” at (√2/2,x,y,z), followed by 8 red vertices in the latitude at (1/2,x,y,z). The complete coordinates are given as linear combinations of the quaternionic units $1, \mathrm{i}, \mathrm{j}, \mathrm{k}$, which at the same time can be taken as the elements of the group 2O. The next deeper latitude is the equator hyperplane intersecting the 3-sphere in a 2-sphere which is populated by 6 red and 12 yellow vertices.

Layer 2 is a 2-sphere circumscribing a regular octahedron whose edges have length 1. A tetrahedron with vertex north pole has 1 of these edges as long edge whose 2 vertices are connected by short edges to the north pole. Another long edge runs from the north pole into layer 1 and 2 short edges from there into layer 2.

There are 192 long edges with length 1 connecting equal colours and 144 short edges with length √2–√2 ≈ 0.765367 connecting mixed colours. 192*2/48 = 8 long and 144*2/48 = 6 short, that is together 14 edges meet at any vertex.

The 576 faces are isosceles with 1 long and 2 short edges, all congruent. The angles at the base are arccos(√4+√8/4) ≈ 49.210°. 576*3/48 = 36 faces meet at a vertex, 576*1/192 = 3 at a long edge, and 576*2/144 = 8 at a short one.

The 288 cells are tetrahedra with 4 short edges and 2 antipodal and perpendicular long edges, one of which connects 2 red and the other 2 yellow vertices. All the cells are congruent. 288*4/48 = 24 cells meet at a vertex. 288*2/192 = 3 cells meet at a long edge, 288*4/144 = 8 at a short one. 288*4/576 = 2 cells meet at a triangle.

== Related polytopes ==
D_{4} uniform polychora (red index on Coxeter-Dynkin diagram indicates Wythoff operation table row number)
1  folding:	triality: 2  3  4	triality: 5  6  7	triality: 8  9  10	triality: 11  12  13	14  folding:	15  folding:	16  folding:
r{3,3^{1,1}} {3^{1,1,1}}={3,4,3}	{3,3^{1,1}} h{4,3,3}	t{3,3^{1,1}} h_{2}{4,3,3}	2r{3,3^{1,1}} h_{3}{4,3,3}	2t{3,3^{1,1}} h_{2,3}{4,3,3}	rr{3,3^{1,1}} r{3^{1,1,1}}=r{3,4,3}	tr{3,3^{1,1}} t{3^{1,1,1}}=t{3,4,3}	sr{3,3^{1,1}} s{3^{1,1,1}}=s{3,4,3}

B_{4} family of uniform polytopes:

B4 symmetry polytopes
Name	tesseract	rectified tesseract	truncated tesseract	cantellated tesseract	runcinated tesseract	bitruncated tesseract	cantitruncated tesseract	runcitruncated tesseract	omnitruncated tesseract
Coxeter diagram		=				=			
Schläfli symbol	{4,3,3}	t_{1}{4,3,3} r{4,3,3}	t_{0,1}{4,3,3} t{4,3,3}	t_{0,2}{4,3,3} rr{4,3,3}	t_{0,3}{4,3,3}	t_{1,2}{4,3,3} 2t{4,3,3}	t_{0,1,2}{4,3,3} tr{4,3,3}	t_{0,1,3}{4,3,3}	t_{0,1,2,3}{4,3,3}
Schlegel diagram									
B_{4}									
Name	16-cell	rectified 16-cell	truncated 16-cell	cantellated 16-cell	runcinated 16-cell	bitruncated 16-cell	cantitruncated 16-cell	runcitruncated 16-cell	omnitruncated 16-cell
Coxeter diagram	=	=	=	=		=	=		
Schläfli symbol	{3,3,4}	t_{1}{3,3,4} r{3,3,4}	t_{0,1}{3,3,4} t{3,3,4}	t_{0,2}{3,3,4} rr{3,3,4}	t_{0,3}{3,3,4}	t_{1,2}{3,3,4} 2t{3,3,4}	t_{0,1,2}{3,3,4} tr{3,3,4}	t_{0,1,3}{3,3,4}	t_{0,1,2,3}{3,3,4}
Schlegel diagram									
B_{4}									

F_{4} family of uniform polytopes:

24-cell family polytopes
Name	24-cell	truncated 24-cell	snub 24-cell	rectified 24-cell	cantellated 24-cell	bitruncated 24-cell	cantitruncated 24-cell	runcinated 24-cell	runcitruncated 24-cell	omnitruncated 24-cell
Schläfli symbol	{3,4,3}	t_{0,1}{3,4,3} t{3,4,3}	s{3,4,3}	t_{1}{3,4,3} r{3,4,3}	t_{0,2}{3,4,3} rr{3,4,3}	t_{1,2}{3,4,3} 2t{3,4,3}	t_{0,1,2}{3,4,3} tr{3,4,3}	t_{0,3}{3,4,3}	t_{0,1,3}{3,4,3}	t_{0,1,2,3}{3,4,3}
Coxeter diagram										
Schlegel diagram										
F_{4}										
B_{4}										
B_{3}(a)										
B_{3}(b)										
B_{2}										
