= Dual snub 24-cell =

- Orthogonal projection of dual snub 24-cell
- Type: 4-polytope
- Cells: 96, each with three kites and nine isosceles triangles
- Faces: 432
- Edges: 480
- Vertices: 144
- Dual: snub 24-cell

In geometry, the dual snub 24-cell is a 144 vertex convex 4-polytope composed of 96 irregular cells. Each cell has faces of two kinds: three kites and six isosceles triangles. The polytope has a total of 432 faces (144 kites and 288 isosceles triangles) and 480 edges.

== Geometry ==
The snub 24-cell is a convex uniform 4-polytope that consists of 120 regular tetrahedra and 96 icosahedra as its cell, firstly described by Thorold Gosset in 1900. Its dual is a semiregular, first described by Koca, Al-Ajmi & Ozdes Koca (2011).

The vertices of a dual snub 24-cell are obtained using quaternion simple roots $T'$ in the generation of the 600 vertices of the 120-cell. The following describe $T$ and $T'$ 24-cells as quaternion orbit weights of $D_4$ under the Weyl group $W(D_4)$:
$$\begin{align}
O(0100)&: T = \left\{\pm 1,\pm e_1,\pm e_2,\pm e_3,\frac{\pm 1 \pm e_1 \pm e_2 \pm e_3}{2}\right\} \\
O(1000)&: V_1 \\
O(0010)&: V_2 \\
O(0001)&: V_3 \\
T' &= \sqrt{2} (V_1 \oplus V_2 \oplus V_3) = \begin{bmatrix}
\frac{-1 - e_1}{\sqrt{2}} & \frac{1 - e_1}{\sqrt{2}} & \frac{-1 + e_1}{\sqrt{2}} & \frac{1 + e_1}{\sqrt{2}} & \frac{-e_2 - e_3}{\sqrt{2}} & \frac{e_2 - e_3}{\sqrt{2}} & \frac{-e_2 + e_3}{\sqrt{2}} & \frac{e_2 + e_3}{\sqrt{2}} \\
\frac{-1 - e_2}{\sqrt{2}} & \frac{1 - e_2}{\sqrt{2}} & \frac{-1 + e_2}{\sqrt{2}} & \frac{1 + e_2}{\sqrt{2}} & \frac{-e_1 - e_3}{\sqrt{2}} & \frac{e_1 - e_3}{\sqrt{2}} & \frac{-e_1 + e_3}{\sqrt{2}} & \frac{e_1 + e_3}{\sqrt{2}} \\
\frac{-e_1 - e_2}{\sqrt{2}} & \frac{e_1 - e_2}{\sqrt{2}} & \frac{-e_1 + e_2}{\sqrt{2}} & \frac{e_2 + e_3}{\sqrt{2}} & \frac{-1 - e_3}{\sqrt{2}} & \frac{1 - e_3}{\sqrt{2}} & \frac{-1 + e_3}{\sqrt{2}} & \frac{1 + e_3}{\sqrt{2}}
\end{bmatrix}.
\end{align}$$

With quaternions $(p,q)$ where $\bar p$ is the conjugate of $p$ and $[p,q]:r\rightarrow r'=prq$ and $[p,q]^*:r\rightarrow r''=p\bar rq$, then the Coxeter group $W(H_4)=\lbrace[p,\bar p] \oplus [p,\bar p]^*\rbrace$ is the symmetry group of the 600-cell and the 120-cell of order 14400.

Given $p \in T$ such that $\bar p=\pm p^4$, $\bar p^2=\pm p^3$, $\bar p^3=\pm p^2$, $\bar p^4=\pm p$ and $p^\dagger$ as an exchange of $-1/\phi \leftrightarrow \phi$ within $p$, where $\phi=\frac{1+\sqrt{5}}{2}$ is the golden ratio, one can construct the snub 24-cell $S$, 600-cell $I$, 120-cell $J$, and alternate snub 24-cell $S'$ in the following, respectively:
$$\begin{align}
S = \sum_{i=1}^4\oplus p^i T, &\qquad I=T+S=\sum_{i=0}^4\oplus p^i T, \\
J=\sum_{i,j=0}^4\oplus p^i\bar p^{\dagger j}T', &\qquad S'=\sum_{i=1}^4\oplus p^i\bar p^{\dagger i}T'.
\end{align}$$
This finally can define the dual snub 24-cell as the orbits of $T \oplus T' \oplus S'$.

== Cell ==
The cell of dual snub 24-cell

The dual snub 24-cell has 96 identical cells. The cell can be constructed by multiplying $\frac{1}{2\sqrt{2}}$ to the eight Cartesian coordinates:
$$\begin{matrix} (-\phi, 0, 1), &\qquad (0, -1, -\phi), &\qquad (1, \phi, 0), \\
(-\varphi, \varphi, -\varphi), &\qquad (\varphi, -\varphi, \varphi), &\qquad (\varphi^2, 0, 1), \\
(1, -\varphi^2, 0), &\qquad (0, -1, \varphi^2),
\end{matrix}$$
where $\phi = \frac{1 + \sqrt{5}}{2}$ and $\varphi = \frac{1 - \sqrt{5}}{2}$. These vertices form six isosceles triangles and three kites, where the legs and the base of an isosceles triangle are $\frac{1}{\sqrt{2}}$ and $\frac{\phi}{\sqrt{2}}$, and the two pairs of adjacent equal-length sides of a kite are $\frac{1}{\sqrt{2}}$ and $\frac{\varphi^2}{\sqrt{2}}$.

== See also ==
- Snub 24-cell honeycomb

== Citations ==
Fundamental convex regular and uniform polytopes
Family	A_{n}	B_{n}	I_{2}(p) / D_{n}	E_{6} / E_{7} / E_{8} / F_{4} / G_{2}	H_{n}
Regular polygon	Triangle	Square	p-gon	Hexagon	Pentagon
Uniform polyhedron	Tetrahedron	Octahedron • Cube	Demicube		Dodecahedron • Icosahedron
Uniform polychoron	Pentachoron	16-cell • Tesseract	Demitesseract	24-cell	120-cell • 600-cell
Uniform 5-polytope	5-simplex	5-orthoplex • 5-cube	5-demicube		
Uniform 6-polytope	6-simplex	6-orthoplex • 6-cube	6-demicube	1_{22} • 2_{21}	
Uniform 7-polytope	7-simplex	7-orthoplex • 7-cube	7-demicube	1_{32} • 2_{31} • 3_{21}	
Uniform 8-polytope	8-simplex	8-orthoplex • 8-cube	8-demicube	1_{42} • 2_{41} • 4_{21}	
Uniform n-polytope	n-simplex	n-orthoplex • n-cube	n-demicube	1_{k2} • 2_{k1} • k_{21}	n-pentagonal polytope
Topics: Polytope families • Regular polytope • List of regular polytopes and compounds • Polytope operations
