= Runcinated tesseracts =

| Tesseract | Runcinated tesseract (Runcinated 16-cell) | 16-cell |
| Runcitruncated tesseract (Runcicantellated 16-cell) | Runcitruncated 16-cell (Runcicantellated tesseract) | Omnitruncated tesseract (Omnitruncated 16-cell) |
Orthogonal projections in B_{4} Coxeter plane

In four-dimensional geometry, a runcinated tesseract (or runcinated 16-cell) is a convex uniform 4-polytope, being a runcination (a 3rd order truncation) of the regular tesseract.

There are 4 variations of runcinations of the tesseract including with permutations truncations and cantellations.

== Runcinated tesseract ==
Runcinated tesseract
Schlegel diagram with 16 tetrahedra
| Type | Uniform 4-polytope | |
| Schläfli symbol | t_{0,3}{4,3,3} | |
| Coxeter diagrams | | |
| Cells | 80 | 16 3.3.3; 32 3.4.4; 32 4.4.4 |
| Faces | 208 | 64 {3} 144 {4} |
| Edges | 192 | |
| Vertices | 64 | |
| Vertex figure | Equilateral-triangular antipodium | |
| Symmetry group | B_{4}, [3,3,4], order 384 | |
| Properties | convex | |
| Uniform index | 14 15 16 | |

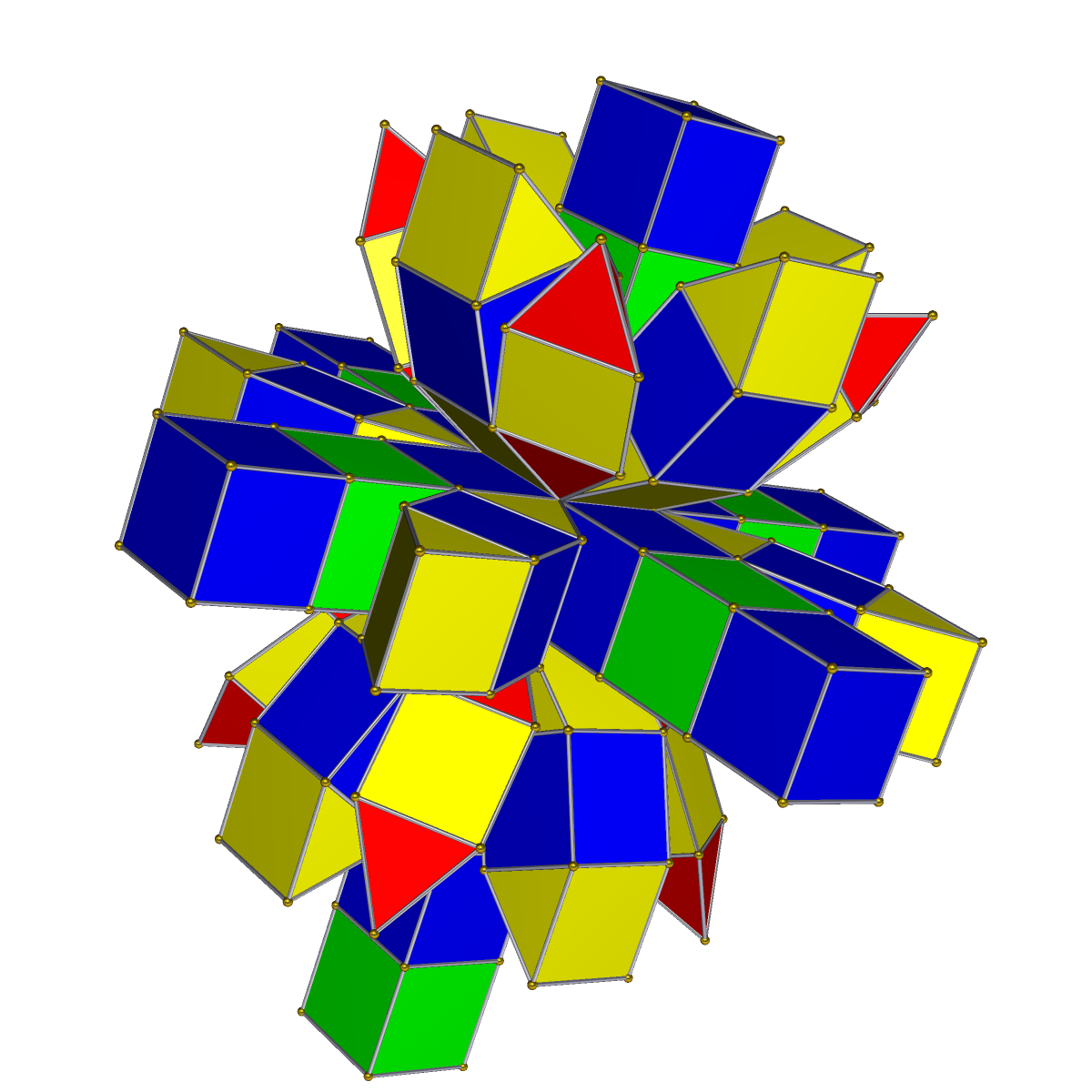
Net

The runcinated tesseract or (small) disprismatotesseractihexadecachoron has 16 tetrahedra, 32 cubes, and 32 triangular prisms. Each vertex is shared by 4 cubes, 3 triangular prisms and one tetrahedron.
Acronym: sidpith (J. Bowers)

=== Construction ===
The runcinated tesseract may be constructed by expanding the cells of a tesseract radially, and filling in the gaps with tetrahedra (vertex figures), cubes (face prisms), and triangular prisms (edge figure prisms). The same process applied to a 16-cell also yields the same figure.

=== Cartesian coordinates ===
The Cartesian coordinates of the vertices of the runcinated tesseract with edge length 2 are all permutations of:

$$\left(\pm 1,\ \pm 1,\ \pm 1,\ \pm(1+\sqrt{2})\right)$$

=== Images ===
Orthographic projections
| Coxeter plane | B_{4} | B_{3} / D_{4} / A_{2} | B_{2} / D_{3} |
|---|---|---|---|
| Graph | | | |
| Dihedral symmetry | [8] | [6] | [4] |
| Coxeter plane | F_{4} | A_{3} | |
| Graph | | | |
| Dihedral symmetry | [12/3] | [4] | |

Schlegel diagrams
| Wireframe | Wireframe with 16 tetrahedra. | Wireframe with 32 triangular prisms. |

=== Structure ===
Eight of the cubical cells are connected to the other 24 cubical cells via all 6 square faces. The other 24 cubical cells are connected to the former 8 cells via only two opposite square faces; the remaining 4 faces are connected to the triangular prisms. The triangular prisms are connected to the tetrahedra via their triangular faces.

The runcinated tesseract can be dissected into 2 cubic cupolae and a rhombicuboctahedral prism between them. This dissection can be seen analogous to the 3D rhombicuboctahedron being dissected into two square cupola and a central octagonal prism.

| cubic cupola | rhombicuboctahedral prism |

=== Projections ===
The cube-first orthographic projection of the runcinated tesseract into 3-dimensional space has a (small) rhombicuboctahedral envelope. The images of its cells are laid out within this envelope as follows:

- The nearest and farthest cube from the 4d viewpoint projects to a cubical volume in the center of the envelope.
- Six cuboidal volumes connect this central cube to the 6 axial square faces of the rhombicuboctahedron. These are the images of 12 of the cubical cells (each pair of cubes share an image).
- The 18 square faces of the envelope are the images of the other cubical cells.
- The 12 wedge-shaped volumes connecting the edges of the central cube to the non-axial square faces of the envelope are the images of 24 of the triangular prisms (a pair of cells per image).
- The 8 triangular faces of the envelope are the images of the remaining 8 triangular prisms.
- Finally, the 8 tetrahedral volumes connecting the vertices of the central cube to the triangular faces of the envelope are the images of the 16 tetrahedra (again, a pair of cells per image).

This layout of cells in projection is analogous to the layout of the faces of the (small) rhombicuboctahedron under projection to 2 dimensions. The rhombicuboctahedron is also constructed from the cube or the octahedron in an analogous way to the runcinated tesseract. Hence, the runcinated tesseract may be thought of as the 4-dimensional analogue of the rhombicuboctahedron.

== Runcitruncated tesseract ==
Runcitruncated tesseract
Schlegel diagram centered on a truncated cube, with cuboctahedral cells shown
| Type | Uniform 4-polytope | |
| Schläfli symbol | t_{0,1,3}{4,3,3} | |
| Coxeter diagrams | | |
| Cells | 80 | 8 3.4.4; 16 3.4.3.4; 24 4.4.8; 32 3.4.4 |
| Faces | 368 | 128 {3} 192 {4} 48 {8} |
| Edges | 480 | |
| Vertices | 192 | |
| Vertex figure | Rectangular pyramid | |
| Symmetry group | B_{4}, [3,3,4], order 384 | |
| Properties | convex | |
| Uniform index | 18 19 20 | |

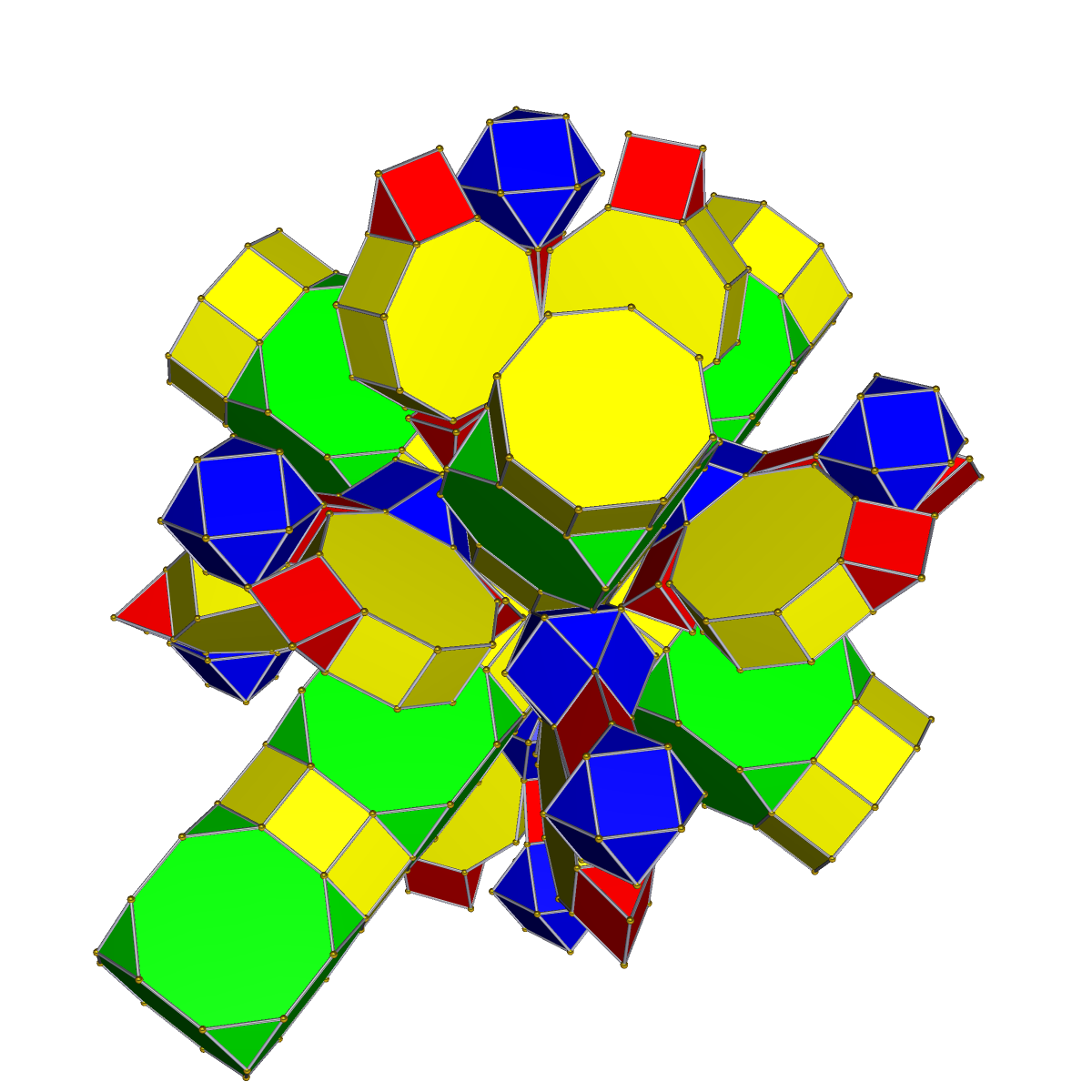
Net

The runcitruncated tesseract, runcicantellated 16-cell, or prismatorhombated hexadecachoron is bounded by 80 cells: 8 truncated cubes, 16 cuboctahedra, 24 octagonal prisms, and 32 triangular prisms.
Acronym: proh

=== Construction ===
The runcitruncated tesseract may be constructed from the truncated tesseract by expanding the truncated cube cells outward radially, and inserting octagonal prisms between them. In the process, the tetrahedra expand into cuboctahedra, and triangular prisms fill in the remaining gaps.

The Cartesian coordinates of the vertices of the runcitruncated tesseract having an edge length of 2 is given by all permutations of:

$$\left(\pm1,\ \pm(1+\sqrt{2}),\ \pm(1+\sqrt{2}),\ \pm(1+2\sqrt{2})\right)$$

=== Projections ===
In the truncated cube first parallel projection of the runcitruncated tesseract into 3-dimensional space, the projection image is laid out as follows:

- The projection envelope is a non-uniform (small) rhombicuboctahedron, with 6 square faces and 12 rectangular faces.
- Two of the truncated cube cells project to a truncated cube in the center of the projection envelope.
- Six octagonal prisms connect this central truncated cube to the square faces of the envelope. These are the images of 12 of the octagonal prism cells, two cells to each image.
- The remaining 12 octagonal prisms are projected to the rectangular faces of the envelope.
- The 6 square faces of the envelope are the images of the remaining 6 truncated cube cells.
- Twelve right-angle triangular prisms connect the inner octagonal prisms. These are the images of 24 of the triangular prism cells. The remaining 8 triangular prisms project onto the triangular faces of the envelope.
- The 8 remaining volumes lying between the triangular faces of the envelope and the inner truncated cube are the images of the 16 cuboctahedral cells, a pair of cells to each image.

=== Images ===
Orthographic projections
| Coxeter plane | B_{4} | B_{3} / D_{4} / A_{2} | B_{2} / D_{3} |
|---|---|---|---|
| Graph | | | |
| Dihedral symmetry | [8] | [6] | [4] |
| Coxeter plane | F_{4} | A_{3} | |
| Graph | | | |
| Dihedral symmetry | [12/3] | [4] | |

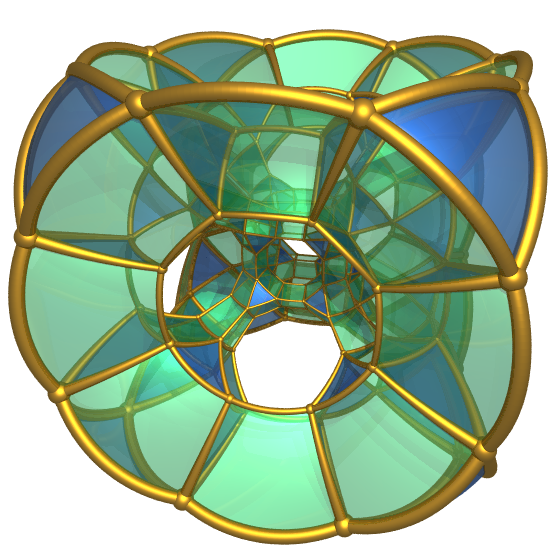
Stereographic projection with its 128 blue triangular faces and its 192 green quad faces.

== Runcitruncated 16-cell ==
Runcitruncated 16-cell
Schlegel diagrams centered on rhombicuboctahedron and truncated tetrahedron
| Type | Uniform 4-polytope | |
| Schläfli symbol | t_{0,1,3}{3,3,4} | |
| Coxeter diagram | | |
| Cells | 80 | 8 3.4.4.4; 16 3.6.6; 24 4.4.4; 32 4.4.6 |
| Faces | 368 | 64 {3} 240 {4} 64 {6} |
| Edges | 480 | |
| Vertices | 192 | |
| Vertex figure | Trapezoidal pyramid | |
| Symmetry group | B_{4}, [3,3,4], order 384 | |
| Properties | convex | |
| Uniform index | 19 20 21 | |

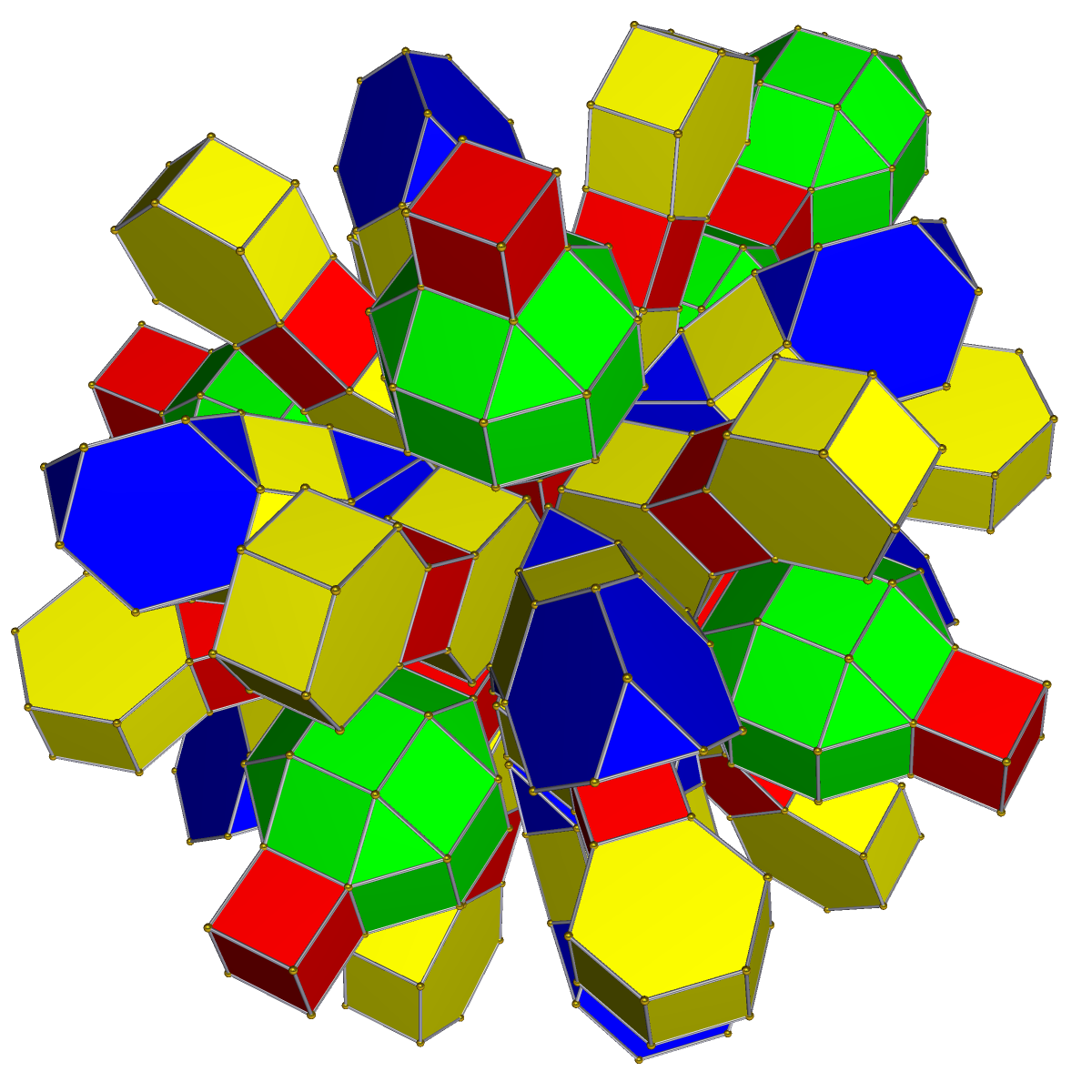
Net

The runcitruncated 16-cell, runcicantellated tesseract, or prismatorhombated tesseract is bounded by 80 cells: 8 rhombicuboctahedra, 16 truncated tetrahedra, 24 cubes, and 32 hexagonal prisms.
Acronym: prit

=== Construction ===
The runcitruncated 16-cell may be constructed by contracting the small rhombicuboctahedral cells of the cantellated tesseract radially, and filling in the spaces between them with cubes. In the process, the octahedral cells expand into truncated tetrahedra (half of their triangular faces are expanded into hexagons by pulling apart the edges), and the triangular prisms expand into hexagonal prisms (each with its three original square faces joined, as before, to small rhombicuboctahedra, and its three new square faces joined to cubes).

The vertices of a runcitruncated 16-cell having an edge length of 2 is given by all permutations of the following Cartesian coordinates:

$$\left(\pm1,\ \pm1,\ \pm(1+\sqrt{2}),\ \pm(1+2\sqrt{2})\right)$$

=== Images ===
Orthographic projections
| Coxeter plane | B_{4} | B_{3} / D_{4} / A_{2} | B_{2} / D_{3} |
|---|---|---|---|
| Graph | | | |
| Dihedral symmetry | [8] | [6] | [4] |
| Coxeter plane | F_{4} | A_{3} | |
| Graph | | | |
| Dihedral symmetry | [12/3] | [4] | |

=== Structure ===
The small rhombicuboctahedral cells are joined via their 6 axial square faces to the cubical cells, and joined via their 12 non-axial square faces to the hexagonal prisms. The cubical cells are joined to the rhombicuboctahedra via 2 opposite faces, and joined to the hexagonal prisms via the remaining 4 faces. The hexagonal prisms are connected to the truncated tetrahedra via their hexagonal faces, and to the rhombicuboctahedra via 3 of their square faces each, and to the cubes via the other 3 square faces. The truncated tetrahedra are joined to the rhombicuboctahedra via their triangular faces, and the hexagonal prisms via their hexagonal faces.

=== Projections ===
The following is the layout of the cells of the runcitruncated 16-cell under the parallel projection, small rhombicuboctahedron first, into 3-dimensional space:

- The projection envelope is a truncated cuboctahedron.
- Six of the small rhombicuboctahedra project onto the 6 octagonal faces of this envelope, and the other two project to a small rhombicuboctahedron lying at the center of this envelope.
- The 6 cuboidal volumes connecting the axial square faces of the central small rhombicuboctahedron to the center of the octagons correspond with the image of 12 of the cubical cells (each pair of the twelve share the same image).
- The remaining 12 cubical cells project onto the 12 square faces of the great rhombicuboctahedral envelope.
- The 8 volumes connecting the hexagons of the envelope to the triangular faces of the central rhombicuboctahedron are the images of the 16 truncated tetrahedra.
- The remaining 12 spaces connecting the non-axial square faces of the central small rhombicuboctahedron to the square faces of the envelope are the images of 24 of the hexagonal prisms.
- Finally, the last 8 hexagonal prisms project onto the hexagonal faces of the envelope.

This layout of cells is similar to the layout of the faces of the great rhombicuboctahedron under the projection into 2-dimensional space. Hence, the runcitruncated 16-cell may be thought of as one of the 4-dimensional analogues of the great rhombicuboctahedron. The other analogue is the omnitruncated tesseract.

== Omnitruncated tesseract ==
Omnitruncated tesseract
Schlegel diagram, centered on truncated cuboctahedron, truncated octahedral cells shown
| Type | Uniform 4-polytope | |
| Schläfli symbol | t_{0,1,2,3}{3,3,4} | |
| Coxeter diagram | | |
| Cells | 80 | 8 4.6.8; 16 4.6.6; 24 4.4.8; 32 4.4.6 |
| Faces | 464 | 288 {4} 128 {6} 48 {8} |
| Edges | 768 | |
| Vertices | 384 | |
| Vertex figure | Chiral scalene tetrahedron | |
| Symmetry group | B_{4}, [3,3,4], order 384 | |
| Properties | convex | |
| Uniform index | 20 21 22 | |

The omnitruncated tesseract, omnitruncated 16-cell, or great disprismatotesseractihexadecachoron is bounded by 80 cells: 8 truncated cuboctahedra, 16 truncated octahedra, 24 octagonal prisms, and 32 hexagonal prisms.
Acronym: gidpith

=== Construction ===
The omnitruncated tesseract can be constructed from the cantitruncated tesseract by radially displacing the truncated cuboctahedral cells so that octagonal prisms can be inserted between their octagonal faces. As a result, the triangular prisms expand into hexagonal prisms, and the truncated tetrahedra expand into truncated octahedra.

The Cartesian coordinates of the vertices of an omnitruncated tesseract having an edge length of 2 are given by all permutations of coordinates and sign of:

$$\left(1,\ 1+\sqrt{2},\ 1+2\sqrt{2},\ 1+3\sqrt{2}\right)$$

=== Structure ===
The truncated cuboctahedra cells are joined to the octagonal prisms via their octagonal faces, the truncated octahedra via their hexagonal faces, and the hexagonal prisms via their square faces. The octagonal prisms are joined to the hexagonal prisms and the truncated octahedra via their square faces, and the hexagonal prisms are joined to the truncated octahedra via their hexagonal faces.

Seen in a configuration matrix, all incidence counts between elements are shown. The diagonal f-vector numbers are derived through the Wythoff construction, dividing the full group order of a subgroup order by removing one mirror at a time. Edges exist at 4 symmetry positions. Squares exist at 3 positions, hexagons 2 positions, and octagons one. Finally the 4 types of cells exist centered on the 4 corners of the fundamental simplex.

| B_{4} | k-face | f_{k} | f_{0} | f_{1} | | | | f_{2} | | | | | | f_{3} | | | | k-figure | Notes |
|---|---|---|---|---|---|---|---|---|---|---|---|---|---|---|---|---|---|---|---|
| | ( ) | f_{0} | 384 | 1 | 1 | 1 | 1 | 1 | 1 | 1 | 1 | 1 | 1 | 1 | 1 | 1 | 1 | 4.( ) | B_{4} = 384 |
| A_{1} | { } | f_{1} | 2 | 192 | * | * | * | 1 | 1 | 1 | 0 | 0 | 0 | 1 | 1 | 1 | 0 | 3.( ) | B_{4}/A_{1} = 192 |
| A_{1} | { } | f_{1} | 2 | * | 192 | * | * | 1 | 0 | 0 | 1 | 1 | 0 | 1 | 1 | 0 | 1 | 3.( ) | B_{4}/A_{1} = 192 |
| A_{1} | { } | f_{1} | 2 | * | * | 192 | * | 0 | 1 | 0 | 1 | 0 | 1 | 1 | 0 | 1 | 1 | 3.( ) | B_{4}/A_{1} = 192 |
| A_{1} | { } | f_{1} | 2 | * | * | * | 192 | 0 | 0 | 1 | 0 | 1 | 1 | 0 | 1 | 1 | 1 | 3.( ) | B_{4}/A_{1} = 192 |
| A_{2} | {6} | f_{2} | 6 | 3 | 3 | 0 | 0 | 64 | * | * | * | * | * | 1 | 1 | 0 | 0 | { } | B_{4}/A_{2} = 64 |
| A_{1}A_{1} | {4} | f_{2} | 4 | 2 | 0 | 2 | 0 | * | 96 | * | * | * | * | 1 | 0 | 1 | 0 | { } | B_{4}/A_{1}A_{1} = 96 |
| A_{1}A_{1} | {4} | f_{2} | 4 | 2 | 0 | 0 | 2 | * | * | 96 | * | * | * | 0 | 1 | 1 | 0 | { } | B_{4}/A_{1}A_{1} = 96 |
| A_{2} | {6} | f_{2} | 6 | 0 | 3 | 3 | 0 | * | * | * | 64 | * | * | 1 | 0 | 0 | 1 | { } | B_{4}/A_{2} = 64 |
| A_{1}A_{1} | {4} | f_{2} | 4 | 0 | 2 | 0 | 2 | * | * | * | * | 96 | * | 0 | 1 | 0 | 1 | { } | B_{4}/A_{1}A_{1} = 96 |
| B_{2} | {8} | f_{2} | 8 | 0 | 0 | 4 | 4 | * | * | * | * | * | 48 | 0 | 0 | 1 | 1 | { } | B_{4}/B_{2} = 48 |
| A_{3} | tr{3,3} | f_{3} | 24 | 12 | 12 | 12 | 0 | 4 | 6 | 0 | 4 | 0 | 0 | 16 | * | * | * | ( ) | B_{4}/A_{3} = 16 |
| A_{2}A_{1} | {6}×{ } | f_{3} | 12 | 6 | 6 | 0 | 6 | 2 | 0 | 3 | 0 | 3 | 0 | * | 32 | * | * | ( ) | B_{4}/A_{2}A_{1} = 32 |
| B_{2}A_{1} | {8}×{ } | f_{3} | 16 | 8 | 0 | 8 | 8 | 0 | 4 | 4 | 0 | 0 | 2 | * | * | 24 | * | ( ) | B_{4}/B_{2}A_{1} = 24 |
| B_{3} | tr{4,3} | f_{3} | 48 | 0 | 24 | 24 | 24 | 0 | 0 | 0 | 8 | 12 | 6 | * | * | * | 8 | ( ) | B_{4}/B_{3} = 8 |

=== Projections ===
In the truncated cuboctahedron first parallel projection of the omnitruncated tesseract into 3 dimensions, the images of its cells are laid out as follows:

- The projection envelope is in the shape of a non-uniform truncated cuboctahedron.
- Two of the truncated cuboctahedra project to the center of the projection envelope.
- The remaining 6 truncated cuboctahedra project to the (non-regular) octagonal faces of the envelope. These are connected to the central truncated cuboctahedron via 6 octagonal prisms, which are the images of the octagonal prism cells, a pair to each image.
- The 8 hexagonal faces of the envelope are the images of 8 of the hexagonal prisms.
- The remaining hexagonal prisms are projected to 12 non-regular hexagonal prism images, lying where a cube's edges would be. Each image corresponds to two cells.
- Finally, the 8 volumes between the hexagonal faces of the projection envelope and the hexagonal faces of the central truncated cuboctahedron are the images of the 16 truncated octahedra, two cells to each image.

This layout of cells in projection is similar to that of the runcitruncated 16-cell, which is analogous to the layout of faces in the octagon-first projection of the truncated cuboctahedron into 2 dimensions. Thus, the omnitruncated tesseract may be thought of as another analogue of the truncated cuboctahedron in 4 dimensions.

=== Images ===
Orthographic projections
| Coxeter plane | B_{4} | B_{3} / D_{4} / A_{2} | B_{2} / D_{3} |
|---|---|---|---|
| Graph | | | |
| Dihedral symmetry | [8] | [6] | [4] |
| Coxeter plane | F_{4} | A_{3} | |
| Graph | | | |
| Dihedral symmetry | [12/3] | [4] | |

Perspective projections
| Perspective projection centered on one of the truncated cuboctahedral cells, highlighted in yellow. Six of the surrounding octagonal prisms rendered in blue, and the remaining cells in green. Cells obscured from 4D viewpoint culled for clarity's sake. | Perspective projection centered on one of the truncated octahedral cells, highlighted in yellow. Four of the surrounding hexagonal prisms are shown in blue, with 4 more truncated octahedra on the other side of these prisms also shown in yellow. Cells obscured from 4D viewpoint culled for clarity's sake. Some of the other hexagonal and octagonal prisms may be discerned from this view as well. |
Stereographic projections
| Centered on truncated cuboctahedron | Centered on truncated octahedron |

Net
| Omnitruncated tesseract | Dual to omnitruncated tesseract |

=== Full snub tesseract ===
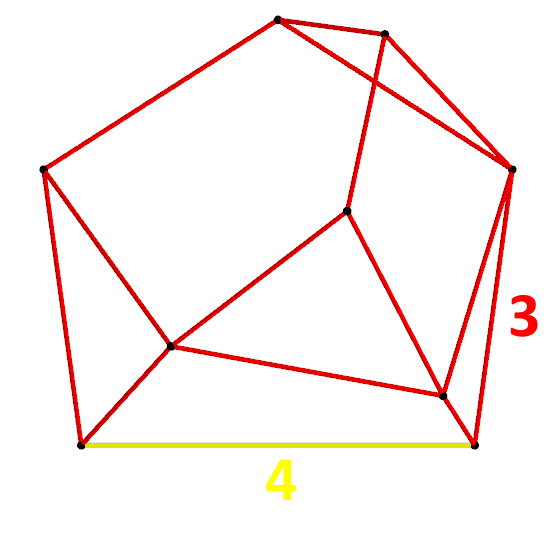
Vertex figure for the omnisnub tesseract

The full snub tesseract or omnisnub tesseract, defined as an alternation of the omnitruncated tesseract, can not be made uniform, but it can be given Coxeter diagram, and symmetry [4,3,3]^{+}, and constructed from 8 snub cubes, 16 icosahedra, 24 square antiprisms, 32 octahedra (as triangular antiprisms), and 192 tetrahedra filling the gaps at the deleted vertices. It has 272 cells, 944 faces, 864 edges, and 192 vertices.

=== Bialternatosnub 16-cell ===
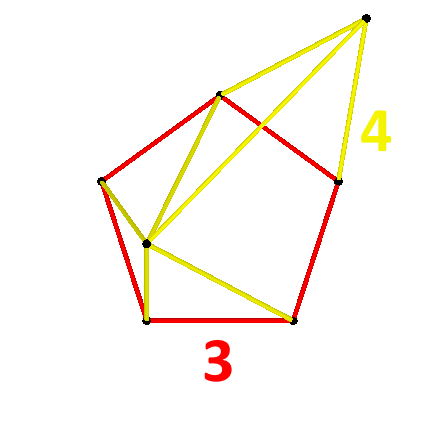
Vertex figure for the bialternatosnub 16-cell

The bialternatosnub 16-cell or runcic snub rectified 16-cell, constructed by removing alternating long rectangles from the octagons, is also not uniform. Like the omnisnub tesseract, it has a highest symmetry construction of order 192, with 8 rhombicuboctahedra (with T_{h} symmetry), 16 icosahedra (with T symmetry), 24 rectangular trapezoprisms (topologically equivalent to a cube but with D_{2d} symmetry), 32 triangular prisms, with 96 triangular prisms (as C_{s}-symmetry wedges) filling the gaps.

A variant with regular icosahedra and uniform triangular prisms has two edge lengths in the ratio of 1 : 2, and occurs as a vertex-faceting of the scaliform runcic snub 24-cell.

== Related uniform polytopes ==
B4 symmetry polytopes
| Name | tesseract | rectified tesseract | truncated tesseract | cantellated tesseract | runcinated tesseract | bitruncated tesseract | cantitruncated tesseract | runcitruncated tesseract | omnitruncated tesseract |
| Coxeter diagram | | = | | | | = | | | |
| Schläfli symbol | {4,3,3} | t_{1}{4,3,3} r{4,3,3} | t_{0,1}{4,3,3} t{4,3,3} | t_{0,2}{4,3,3} rr{4,3,3} | t_{0,3}{4,3,3} | t_{1,2}{4,3,3} 2t{4,3,3} | t_{0,1,2}{4,3,3} tr{4,3,3} | t_{0,1,3}{4,3,3} | t_{0,1,2,3}{4,3,3} |
|---|---|---|---|---|---|---|---|---|---|
| Schlegel diagram | | | | | | | | | |
| B_{4} | | | | | | | | | |
| Name | 16-cell | rectified 16-cell | truncated 16-cell | cantellated 16-cell | runcinated 16-cell | bitruncated 16-cell | cantitruncated 16-cell | runcitruncated 16-cell | omnitruncated 16-cell |
| Coxeter diagram | = | = | = | = | | = | = | | |
| Schläfli symbol | {3,3,4} | t_{1}{3,3,4} r{3,3,4} | t_{0,1}{3,3,4} t{3,3,4} | t_{0,2}{3,3,4} rr{3,3,4} | t_{0,3}{3,3,4} | t_{1,2}{3,3,4} 2t{3,3,4} | t_{0,1,2}{3,3,4} tr{3,3,4} | t_{0,1,3}{3,3,4} | t_{0,1,2,3}{3,3,4} |
| Schlegel diagram | | | | | | | | | |
| B_{4} | | | | | | | | | |

== Notes ==
Fundamental convex regular and uniform polytopes
| Family | A_{n} | B_{n} | I_{2}(p) / D_{n} | E_{6} / E_{7} / E_{8} / F_{4} / G_{2} | H_{n} |
| Regular polygon | Triangle | Square | p-gon | Hexagon | Pentagon |
| Uniform polyhedron | Tetrahedron | Octahedron • Cube | Demicube | | Dodecahedron • Icosahedron |
| Uniform polychoron | Pentachoron | 16-cell • Tesseract | Demitesseract | 24-cell | 120-cell • 600-cell |
| Uniform 5-polytope | 5-simplex | 5-orthoplex • 5-cube | 5-demicube | | |
| Uniform 6-polytope | 6-simplex | 6-orthoplex • 6-cube | 6-demicube | 1_{22} • 2_{21} | |
| Uniform 7-polytope | 7-simplex | 7-orthoplex • 7-cube | 7-demicube | 1_{32} • 2_{31} • 3_{21} | |
| Uniform 8-polytope | 8-simplex | 8-orthoplex • 8-cube | 8-demicube | 1_{42} • 2_{41} • 4_{21} | |
| Uniform n-polytope | n-simplex | n-orthoplex • n-cube | n-demicube | 1_{k2} • 2_{k1} • k_{21} | n-pentagonal polytope |
Topics: Polytope families • Regular polytope • List of regular polytopes and compounds • Polytope operations
