= Schlegel diagram =

Representation of 3D and 4D polytopes

Examples colored by the number of sides on each face. Yellow triangles, red squares, and green pentagons.

A tesseract projected into 3-space as a Schlegel diagram. There are 8 cubic cells visible: the outer cell into which the others are projected, one below each of the six exterior faces, and one in the center.

Various visualizations of the icosahedron

perspective

Net

Orthogonal

Petrie

Schlegel

Vertex figure

In geometry, a Schlegel diagram is a projection of a polytope from $\mathbb{R}^d$ into $\mathbb{R}^{d-1}$ through a point just outside one of its facets. The resulting entity is a polytopal subdivision of the facet in $\mathbb{R}^{d-1}$ that, together with the original facet, is combinatorially equivalent to the original polytope. The diagram is named for Victor Schlegel, who in 1886 introduced this tool for studying combinatorial and topological properties of polytopes. In dimension 3, a Schlegel diagram is a projection of a polyhedron into a plane figure; in dimension 4, it is a projection of a 4-polytope to 3-space. As such, Schlegel diagrams are commonly used as a means of visualizing four-dimensional polytopes.

== Construction ==
The most elementary Schlegel diagram, that of a polyhedron, was described by Duncan Sommerville as follows:

A very useful method of representing a convex polyhedron is by plane projection. If it is projected from any external point, since each ray cuts it twice, it will be represented by a polygonal area divided twice over into polygons. It is always possible by suitable choice of the centre of projection to make the projection of one face completely contain the projections of all the other faces. This is called a Schlegel diagram of the polyhedron. The Schlegel diagram completely represents the morphology of the polyhedron. It is sometimes convenient to project the polyhedron from a vertex; this vertex is projected to infinity and does not appear in the diagram, the edges through it are represented by lines drawn outwards.

Sommerville also considers the case of a simplex in four dimensions: "The Schlegel diagram of simplex in S_{4} is a tetrahedron divided into four tetrahedra." More generally, a polytope in n-dimensions has a Schlegel diagram constructed by a perspective projection viewed from a point outside of the polytope, above the center of a facet. All vertices and edges of the polytope are projected onto a hyperplane of that facet. If the polytope is convex, a point near the facet will exist which maps the facet outside, and all other facets inside, so no edges need to cross in the projection.

== Examples ==
Dodecahedron	120-cell
12 pentagon faces in the plane	120 dodecahedral cells in 3-space

== See also ==
- Net (polyhedron) – A different approach for visualization by lowering the dimension of a polytope is to build a net, disconnecting facets, and unfolding until the facets can exist on a single hyperplane. This maintains the geometric scale and shape, but makes the topological connections harder to see.
