= B4 polytope =

Orthographic projections in the B_{4} Coxeter plane
| Tesseract | 16-cell |

In 4-dimensional geometry, there are 15 uniform 4-polytopes with B_{4} symmetry. There are two regular forms, the tesseract and 16-cell, with 16 and 8 vertices respectively.

== Visualizations ==
They can be visualized as symmetric orthographic projections in Coxeter planes of the B_{5} Coxeter group, and other subgroups.

Symmetric orthographic projections of these 32 polytopes can be made in the B_{5}, B_{4}, B_{3}, B_{2}, A_{3}, Coxeter planes. A_{k} has [k+1] symmetry, and B_{k} has [2k] symmetry.

These 32 polytopes are each shown in these 5 symmetry planes, with vertices and edges drawn, and vertices colored by the number of overlapping vertices in each projective position.

The pictures are drawn as Schlegel diagram perspective projections, centered on the cell at pos. 3, with a consistent orientation, and the 16 cells at position 0 are shown solid, alternately colored.

| # | Name | Coxeter plane projections | | | | Schlegel diagrams | | Net |
| # | Name | B_{4} [8] | B_{3} [6] | B_{2} [4] | A_{3} [4] | Cube centered | Tetrahedron centered | Net |
|---|---|---|---|---|---|---|---|---|
| 1 | 8-cell or tesseract = {4,3,3} | | | | | | | |
| 2 | rectified 8-cell = r{4,3,3} | | | | | | | |
| 3 | 16-cell = {3,3,4} | | | | | | | |
| 4 | truncated 8-cell = t{4,3,3} | | | | | | | |
| 5 | cantellated 8-cell = rr{4,3,3} | | | | | | | |
| 6 | runcinated 8-cell (also runcinated 16-cell) = t03{4,3,3} | | | | | | | |
| 7 | bitruncated 8-cell (also bitruncated 16-cell) = 2t{4,3,3} | | | | | | | |
| 8 | truncated 16-cell = t{3,3,4} | | | | | | | |
| 9 | cantitruncated 8-cell = tr{3,3,4} | | | | | | | |
| 10 | runcitruncated 8-cell = t013{4,3,3} | | | | | | | |
| 11 | runcitruncated 16-cell = t013{3,3,4} | | | | | | | |
| 12 | omnitruncated 8-cell (also omnitruncated 16-cell) = t0123{4,3,3} | | | | | | | |

| # | Name | Coxeter plane projections | | | | | Schlegel diagrams | | Net |
| # | Name | F_{4} [12] | B_{4} [8] | B_{3} [6] | B_{2} [4] | A_{3} [4] | Cube centered | Tetrahedron centered | Net |
|---|---|---|---|---|---|---|---|---|---|
| 13 | *rectified 16-cell (Same as 24-cell) = r{3,3,4} = {3,4,3} | | | | | | | | |
| 14 | *cantellated 16-cell (Same as rectified 24-cell) = rr{3,3,4} = r{3,4,3} | | | | | | | | |
| 15 | *cantitruncated 16-cell (Same as truncated 24-cell) = tr{3,3,4} = t{3,4,3} | | | | | | | | |

| # | Name | Coxeter plane projections | | | | | Schlegel diagrams | | Net |
| # | Name | F_{4} [12] | B_{4} [8] | B_{3} [6] | B_{2} [4] | A_{3} [4] | Cube centered | Tetrahedron centered | Net |
|---|---|---|---|---|---|---|---|---|---|
| 16 | alternated cantitruncated 16-cell (Same as the snub 24-cell) = sr{3,3,4} = s{3,4,3} | | | | | | | | |

== Coordinates ==
The tesseractic family of 4-polytopes are given by the convex hulls of the base points listed in the following table, with all permutations of coordinates and sign taken. Each base point generates a distinct uniform 4-polytopes. All coordinates correspond with uniform 4-polytopes of edge length 2.

Coordinates for uniform 4-polytopes in Tesseract/16-cell family
| # | Base point | Name | Coxeter diagram | Vertices | |
|---|---|---|---|---|---|
| 3 | (0,0,0,1)√2 | 16-cell | | 8 | 2^{4-3}4!/3! |
| 1 | (1,1,1,1) | Tesseract | | 16 | 2^{4}4!/4! |
| 13 | (0,0,1,1)√2 | Rectified 16-cell (24-cell) | | 24 | 2^{4-2}4!/(2!2!) |
| 2 | (0,1,1,1)√2 | Rectified tesseract | | 32 | 2^{4}4!/(3!2!) |
| 8 | (0,0,1,2)√2 | Truncated 16-cell | | 48 | 2^{4-2}4!/2! |
| 6 | (1,1,1,1) + (0,0,0,1)√2 | Runcinated tesseract | | 64 | 2^{4}4!/3! |
| 4 | (1,1,1,1) + (0,1,1,1)√2 | Truncated tesseract | | 64 | 2^{4}4!/3! |
| 14 | (0,1,1,2)√2 | Cantellated 16-cell (rectified 24-cell) | | 96 | 2^{4}4!/(2!2!) |
| 7 | (0,1,2,2)√2 | Bitruncated 16-cell | | 96 | 2^{4}4!/(2!2!) |
| 5 | (1,1,1,1) + (0,0,1,1)√2 | Cantellated tesseract | | 96 | 2^{4}4!/(2!2!) |
| 15 | (0,1,2,3)√2 | cantitruncated 16-cell (truncated 24-cell) | | 192 | 2^{4}4!/2! |
| 11 | (1,1,1,1) + (0,0,1,2)√2 | Runcitruncated 16-cell | | 192 | 2^{4}4!/2! |
| 10 | (1,1,1,1) + (0,1,1,2)√2 | Runcitruncated tesseract | | 192 | 2^{4}4!/2! |
| 9 | (1,1,1,1) + (0,1,2,2)√2 | Cantitruncated tesseract | | 192 | 2^{4}4!/2! |
| 12 | (1,1,1,1) + (0,1,2,3)√2 | Omnitruncated 16-cell | | 384 | 2^{4}4! |

Fundamental convex regular and uniform polytopes in dimensions 2–10
| Family | A_{n} | B_{n} | I_{2}(p) / D_{n} | E_{6} / E_{7} / E_{8} / F_{4} / G_{2} | H_{n} |
| Regular polygon | Triangle | Square | p-gon | Hexagon | Pentagon |
| Uniform polyhedron | Tetrahedron | Octahedron • Cube | Demicube | | Dodecahedron • Icosahedron |
| Uniform polychoron | Pentachoron | 16-cell • Tesseract | Demitesseract | 24-cell | 120-cell • 600-cell |
| Uniform 5-polytope | 5-simplex | 5-orthoplex • 5-cube | 5-demicube | | |
| Uniform 6-polytope | 6-simplex | 6-orthoplex • 6-cube | 6-demicube | 1_{22} • 2_{21} | |
| Uniform 7-polytope | 7-simplex | 7-orthoplex • 7-cube | 7-demicube | 1_{32} • 2_{31} • 3_{21} | |
| Uniform 8-polytope | 8-simplex | 8-orthoplex • 8-cube | 8-demicube | 1_{42} • 2_{41} • 4_{21} | |
| Uniform 9-polytope | 9-simplex | 9-orthoplex • 9-cube | 9-demicube | | |
| Uniform 10-polytope | 10-simplex | 10-orthoplex • 10-cube | 10-demicube | | |
| Uniform n-polytope | n-simplex | n-orthoplex • n-cube | n-demicube | 1_{k2} • 2_{k1} • k_{21} | n-pentagonal polytope |
Topics: Polytope families • Regular polytope • List of regular polytopes and compounds • Polytope operations
