= D4 polytope =

In 4-dimensional geometry, there are 7 uniform 4-polytopes with reflections of D_{4} symmetry, all are shared with higher symmetry constructions in the B_{4} or F_{4} symmetry families. there is also one half symmetry alternation, the snub 24-cell.

== Visualizations ==
Each can be visualized as symmetric orthographic projections in Coxeter planes of the D_{4} Coxeter group, and other subgroups. The B_{4} coxeter planes are also displayed, while D_{4} polytopes only have half the symmetry. They can also be shown in perspective projections of Schlegel diagrams, centered on different cells.

D_{4} polytopes related to B_{4}
index	Name Coxeter diagram = =	Coxeter plane projections			Schlegel diagrams		Net
index	Name Coxeter diagram = =	B_{4} [8]	D_{4}, B_{3} [6]	D_{3}, B_{2} [4]	Cube centered	Tetrahedron centered	Net
1	demitesseract (Same as 16-cell) = = h{4,3,3} = = {3,3,4} {3,3^{1,1}}						
2	cantic tesseract (Same as truncated 16-cell) = = h_{2}{4,3,3} = = t{3,3,4} t{3,3^{1,1}}						
3	runcic tesseract birectified 16-cell (Same as rectified tesseract) = = h_{3}{4,3,3} = = r{4,3,3} 2r{3,3^{1,1}}						
4	runcicantic tesseract bitruncated 16-cell (Same as bitruncated tesseract) = = h_{2,3}{4,3,3} = = 2t{4,3,3} 2t{3,3^{1,1}}						

D_{4} polytopes related to F_{4} and B_{4}
index	Name Coxeter diagram = =	Coxeter plane projections				Schlegel diagrams		Parallel 3D	Net
index	Name Coxeter diagram = =	F_{4} [12]	B_{4} [8]	D_{4}, B_{3} [6]	D_{3}, B_{2} [2]	Cube centered	Tetrahedron centered	D_{4} [6]	Net
5	rectified 16-cell (Same as 24-cell) = = {3^{1,1,1}} = r{3,3,4} = {3,4,3}								
6	cantellated 16-cell (Same as rectified 24-cell) = = r{3^{1,1,1}} = rr{3,3,4} = r{3,4,3}								
7	cantitruncated 16-cell (Same as truncated 24-cell) = = t{3^{1,1,1}} = tr{3,3^{1,1}} = tr{3,3,4} = t{3,4,3}								
8	(Same as snub 24-cell) = = s{3^{1,1,1}} = sr{3,3^{1,1}} = sr{3,3,4} = s{3,4,3}								

== Coordinates ==
The base point can generate the coordinates of the polytope by taking all coordinate permutations and sign combinations. The edges' length will be √2. Some polytopes have two possible generator points. Points are prefixed by Even to imply only an even count of sign permutations should be included.

#	Name(s)	Base point	Johnson	Coxeter diagrams		
#	Name(s)	Base point	Johnson	D_{4}	B_{4}	F_{4}
1	hγ_{4}	Even (1,1,1,1)	demitesseract			
3	h_{3}γ_{4}	Even (1,1,1,3)	runcic tesseract			
2	h_{2}γ_{4}	Even (1,1,3,3)	cantic tesseract			
4	h_{2,3}γ_{4}	Even (1,3,3,3)	runcicantic tesseract			
1	t_{3}γ_{4} = β_{4}	(0,0,0,2)	16-cell			
5	t_{2}γ_{4} = t_{1}β_{4}	(0,0,2,2)	rectified 16-cell			
2	t_{2,3}γ_{4} = t_{0,1}β_{4}	(0,0,2,4)	truncated 16-cell			
6	t_{1}γ_{4} = t_{2}β_{4}	(0,2,2,2)	cantellated 16-cell			
9	t_{1,3}γ_{4} = t_{0,2}β_{4}	(0,2,2,4)	cantellated 16-cell			
7	t_{1,2,3}γ = t_{0,1,2}β_{4}	(0,2,4,6)	cantitruncated 16-cell			
8	s{3^{1,1,1}}	(0,1,φ,φ+1)/√2	Snub 24-cell			

D_{4} uniform polychora (red index on Coxeter-Dynkin diagram indicates Wythoff operation table row number)
1  folding:	triality: 2  3  4	triality: 5  6  7	triality: 8  9  10	triality: 11  12  13	14  folding:	15  folding:	16  folding:
r{3,3^{1,1}} {3^{1,1,1}}={3,4,3}	{3,3^{1,1}} h{4,3,3}	t{3,3^{1,1}} h_{2}{4,3,3}	2r{3,3^{1,1}} h_{3}{4,3,3}	2t{3,3^{1,1}} h_{2,3}{4,3,3}	rr{3,3^{1,1}} r{3^{1,1,1}}=r{3,4,3}	tr{3,3^{1,1}} t{3^{1,1,1}}=t{3,4,3}	sr{3,3^{1,1}} s{3^{1,1,1}}=s{3,4,3}
