= Cantellated tesseract =

Convex uniform 4-polytope

Four cantellations
tesseract	Cantellated tesseract	Cantellated 16-cell (Rectified 24-cell)
16-cell	Cantitruncated tesseract	Cantitruncated 16-cell (Truncated 24-cell)
Orthogonal projections in A_{4} Coxeter plane

In four-dimensional geometry, a cantellated tesseract is a convex uniform 4-polytope, being a cantellation (a 2nd order truncation) of the regular tesseract.

There are four degrees of cantellations of the tesseract including with permutations truncations. Two are also derived from the 24-cell family.

== Cantellated tesseract ==
Cantellated tesseract
Schlegel diagram Centered on rhombicuboctahedron octahedral cells shown
Type	Uniform 4-polytope	
Schläfli symbol	rr{4,3,3} $r\begin{Bmatrix} 4 \\ 3 , 3 \end{Bmatrix}$	
Coxeter diagram		
Cells	56	8 3.4.4.4; 16 3.3.3.3; 32 3.4.4
Faces	248	128 {3} 120 {4}
Edges	288	
Vertices	96	
Vertex figure	Square wedge	
Symmetry group	B_{4}, [3,3,4], order 384	
Properties	convex	
Uniform index	13 14 15	

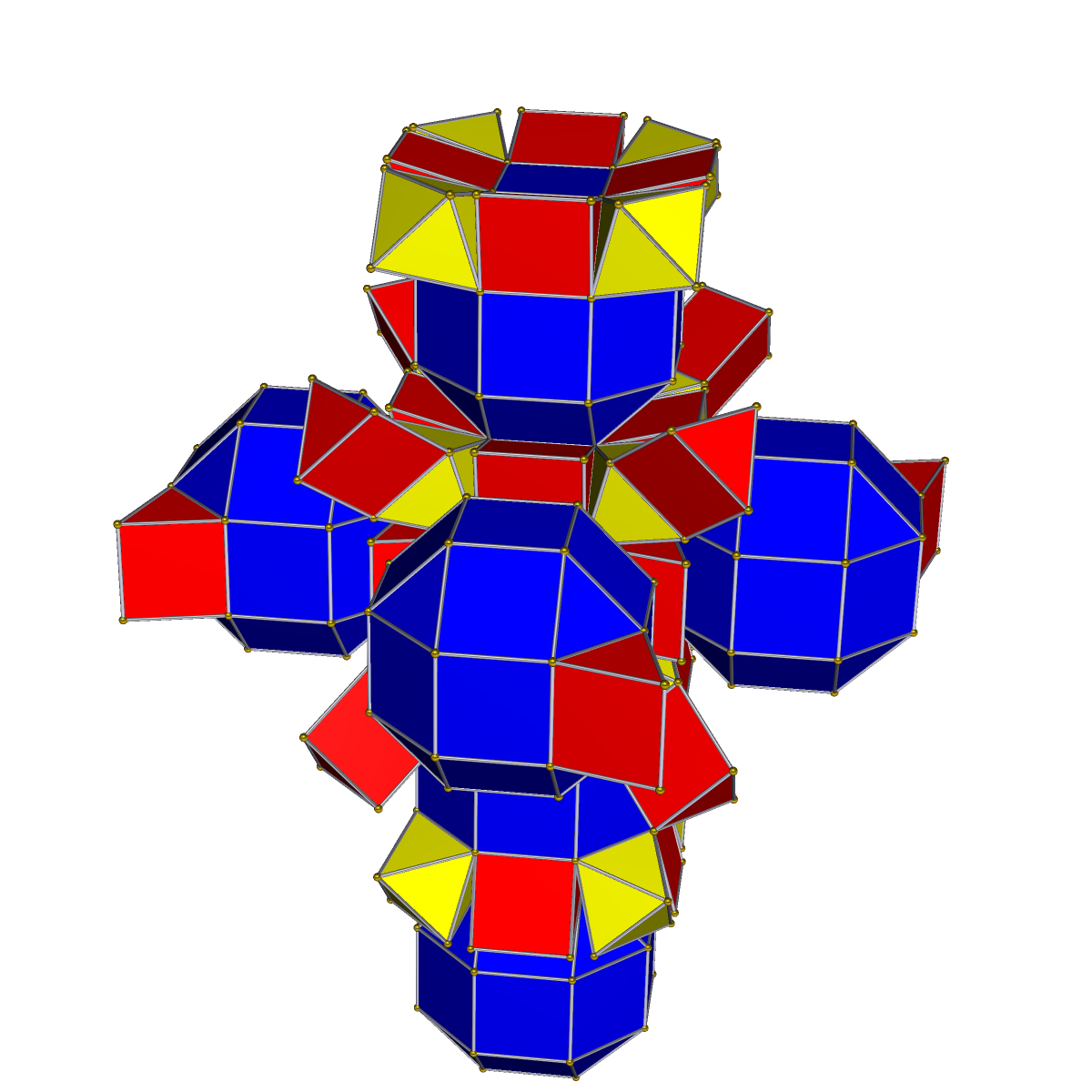
Net

The cantellated tesseract, bicantellated 16-cell, or small rhombated tesseract is a convex uniform 4-polytope or 4-dimensional polytope bounded by 56 cells: 8 small rhombicuboctahedra, 16 octahedra, and 32 triangular prisms.

=== Construction ===
In the process of cantellation, a polytope's 2-faces are effectively shrunk. The rhombicuboctahedron can be called a cantellated cube, since if its six faces are shrunk in their respective planes, each vertex will separate into the three vertices of the rhombicuboctahedron's triangles, and each edge will separate into two of the opposite edges of the rhombicuboctahedrons twelve non-axial squares.

When the same process is applied to the tesseract, each of the eight cubes becomes a rhombicuboctahedron in the described way. In addition however, since each cube's edge was previously shared with two other cubes, the separating edges form the three parallel edges of a triangular prism—32 triangular prisms, since there were 32 edges. Further, since each vertex was previously shared with three other cubes, the vertex would split into 12 rather than three new vertices. However, since some of the shrunken faces continues to be shared, certain pairs of these 12 potential vertices are identical to each other, and therefore only 6 new vertices are created from each original vertex (hence the cantellated tesseract's 96 vertices compared to the tesseract's 16). These six new vertices form the vertices of an octahedron—16 octahedra, since the tesseract had 16 vertices.

=== Cartesian coordinates ===
The Cartesian coordinates of the vertices of a cantellated tesseract with edge length 2 is given by all permutations of:

$$\left(\pm1,\ \pm1,\ \pm(1+\sqrt{2}),\ \pm(1+\sqrt{2})\right)$$

=== Structure ===
The 8 small rhombicuboctahedral cells are joined to each other via their axial square faces. Their non-axial square faces, which correspond with the edges of a cube, are connected to the triangular prisms. The triangular faces of the small rhombicuboctahedra and the triangular prisms are connected to the 16 octahedra.

Its structure can be imagined by means of the tesseract itself: the rhombicuboctahedra are analogous to the tesseract's cells, the triangular prisms are analogous to the tesseract's edges, and the octahedra are analogous to the tesseract's vertices.

=== Images ===
orthographic projections
Coxeter plane	B_{4}	B_{3} / D_{4} / A_{2}	B_{2} / D_{3}
Graph			
Dihedral symmetry	[8]	[6]	[4]
Coxeter plane	F_{4}	A_{3}	
Graph			
Dihedral symmetry	[12/3]	[4]	

Wireframe	16 octahedra shown.	32 triangular prisms shown.

=== Projections ===
The following is the layout of the cantellated tesseract's cells under the parallel projection into 3-dimensional space, small rhombicuboctahedron first:

- The projection envelope is a truncated cube.
- The nearest and farthest small rhombicuboctahedral cells from the 4D viewpoint project to the volume of the same shape inscribed in the projection envelope.
- The axial squares of this central small rhombicuboctahedron touches the centers of the 6 octagons of the envelope. The octagons are the image of the other 6 small rhombicuboctahedral cells.
- The 12 wedge-shaped volumes connecting the non-axial square faces of the central small rhombicuboctahedron to the neighbouring octagons are the images of 24 of the triangular prisms.
- The remaining 8 triangular prisms project onto the triangular faces of the envelope.
- Between the triangular faces of the envelope and the triangular faces of the central small rhombicuboctahedron are 8 octahedral volumes, which are the images of the 16 octahedral cells.

This layout of cells in projection is analogous to the layout of faces in the projection of the truncated cube into 2 dimensions. Hence, the cantellated tesseract may be thought of as an analogue of the truncated cube in 4 dimensions. (It is not the only possible analogue; another close candidate is the truncated tesseract.)

Another uniform 4-polytope with a similar layout of cells is the runcitruncated 16-cell.

== Cantitruncated tesseract ==
Cantitruncated tesseract
Schlegel diagram centered on truncated cuboctahedron cell with octagonal faces hidden.
Type	Uniform 4-polytope	
Schläfli symbol	tr{4,3,3} $t\begin{Bmatrix} 4 \\ 3 , 3 \end{Bmatrix}$	
Coxeter diagrams		
Cells	56	8 4.6.8; 16 3.6.6; 32 3.4.4
Faces	248	64 {3} 96 {4} 64 {6} 24 {8}
Edges	384	
Vertices	192	
Vertex figure	Sphenoid	
Symmetry group	B_{4}, [3,3,4], order 384	
Properties	convex	
Uniform index	17 18 19	

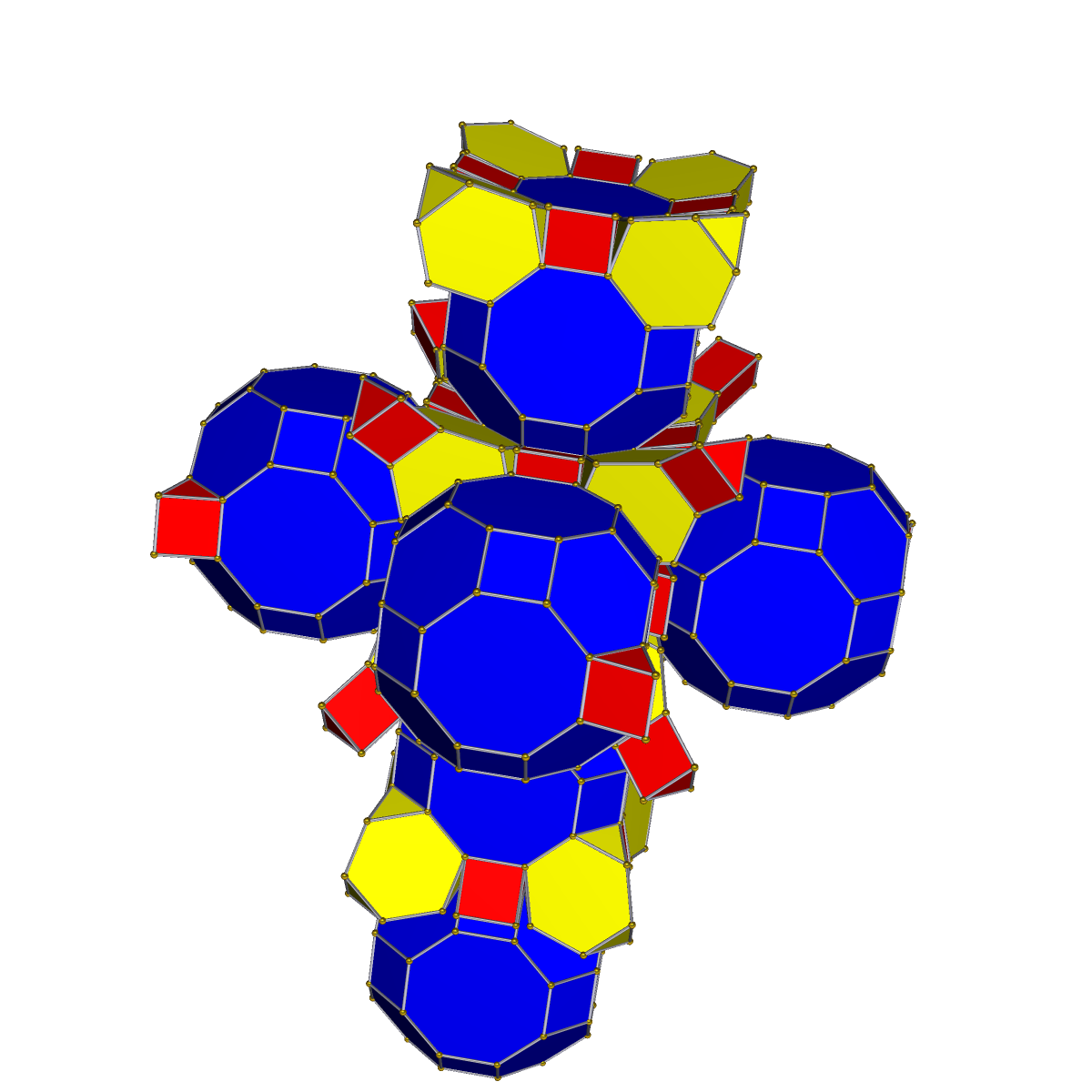
Net

In geometry, the cantitruncated tesseract or great rhombated tesseract is a uniform 4-polytope (or uniform 4-dimensional polytope) that is bounded by 56 cells: 8 truncated cuboctahedra, 16 truncated tetrahedra, and 32 triangular prisms.

=== Construction ===
The cantitruncated tesseract is constructed by the cantitruncation of the tesseract. Cantitruncation is often thought of as rectification followed by truncation. However, the result of this construction would be a polytope which, while its structure would be very similar to that given by cantitruncation, not all of its faces would be uniform.

Alternatively, a uniform cantitruncated tesseract may be constructed by placing 8 uniform truncated cuboctahedra in the hyperplanes of a tesseract's cells, displaced along the coordinate axes such that their octagonal faces coincide. For an edge length of 2, this construction gives the Cartesian coordinates of its vertices as all permutations of:

$$\left(\pm1,\ \pm(1+\sqrt{2}),\ \pm(1+2\sqrt{2}),\ \pm(1+2\sqrt{2})\right)$$

=== Structure ===
The 8 truncated cuboctahedra are joined to each other via their octagonal faces, in an arrangement corresponding to the 8 cubical cells of the tesseract. They are joined to the 16 truncated tetrahedra via their hexagonal faces, and their square faces are joined to the square faces of the 32 triangular prisms. The triangular faces of the triangular prisms are joined to the truncated tetrahedra.

The truncated tetrahedra correspond with the tesseract's vertices, and the triangular prisms correspond with the tesseract's edges.

=== Images ===
orthographic projections
Coxeter plane	B_{4}	B_{3} / D_{4} / A_{2}	B_{2} / D_{3}
Graph			
Dihedral symmetry	[8]	[6]	[4]
Coxeter plane	F_{4}	A_{3}	
Graph			
Dihedral symmetry	[12/3]	[4]	

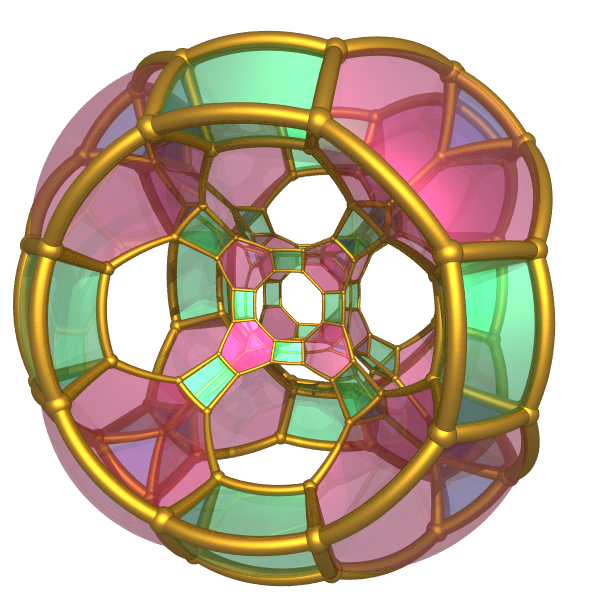
A stereographic projection of the cantitruncated tesseract, as a tiling on a 3-sphere, with its 64 blue triangles, 96 green squares and 64 red hexagonal faces (the octagonal faces are not drawn).

=== Projections ===
In the truncated cuboctahedron first parallel projection into 3 dimensions, the cells of the cantitruncated tesseract are laid out as follows:

- The projection envelope is a non-uniform truncated cube, with longer edges between octagons and shorter edges in the 8 triangles.
- The irregular octagonal faces of the envelope correspond with the images of 6 of the 8 truncated cuboctahedral cells.
- The other two truncated cuboctahedral cells project to a truncated cuboctahedron inscribed in the projection envelope. The octagonal faces touch the irregular octagons of the envelope.
- In the spaces corresponding to a cube's edges lie 12 volumes in the shape of irregular triangular prisms. These are the images, one per pair, of 24 of the triangular prism cells.
- The remaining 8 triangular prisms project onto the triangular faces of the projection envelope.
- The remaining 8 spaces, corresponding to a cube's corners, are the images of the 16 truncated tetrahedra, a pair to each space.

This layout of cells in projection is similar to that of the cantellated tesseract.

=== Alternative names ===
- Cantitruncated tesseract (Norman W. Johnson)
- Cantitruncated 4-cube
- Cantitruncated 8-cell
- Cantitruncated octachoron
- Great prismatotesseractihexadecachoron (George Olshevsky)
- Grit (Jonathan Bowers: for great rhombated tesseract)
- 012-ambo tesseract (John Conway)

== Related uniform polytopes ==
B4 symmetry polytopes
Name	tesseract	rectified tesseract	truncated tesseract	cantellated tesseract	runcinated tesseract	bitruncated tesseract	cantitruncated tesseract	runcitruncated tesseract	omnitruncated tesseract
Coxeter diagram		=				=			
Schläfli symbol	{4,3,3}	t_{1}{4,3,3} r{4,3,3}	t_{0,1}{4,3,3} t{4,3,3}	t_{0,2}{4,3,3} rr{4,3,3}	t_{0,3}{4,3,3}	t_{1,2}{4,3,3} 2t{4,3,3}	t_{0,1,2}{4,3,3} tr{4,3,3}	t_{0,1,3}{4,3,3}	t_{0,1,2,3}{4,3,3}
Schlegel diagram									
B_{4}									
Name	16-cell	rectified 16-cell	truncated 16-cell	cantellated 16-cell	runcinated 16-cell	bitruncated 16-cell	cantitruncated 16-cell	runcitruncated 16-cell	omnitruncated 16-cell
Coxeter diagram	=	=	=	=		=	=		
Schläfli symbol	{3,3,4}	t_{1}{3,3,4} r{3,3,4}	t_{0,1}{3,3,4} t{3,3,4}	t_{0,2}{3,3,4} rr{3,3,4}	t_{0,3}{3,3,4}	t_{1,2}{3,3,4} 2t{3,3,4}	t_{0,1,2}{3,3,4} tr{3,3,4}	t_{0,1,3}{3,3,4}	t_{0,1,2,3}{3,3,4}
Schlegel diagram									
B_{4}									

It is second in a series of cantitruncated hypercubes:

Petrie polygon projections
Truncated cuboctahedron	Cantitruncated tesseract	Cantitruncated 5-cube	Cantitruncated 6-cube	Cantitruncated 7-cube	Cantitruncated 8-cube

Fundamental convex regular and uniform polytopes in dimensions 2–10
Family	A_{n}	B_{n}	I_{2}(p) / D_{n}	E_{6} / E_{7} / E_{8} / F_{4} / G_{2}	H_{n}
Regular polygon	Triangle	Square	p-gon	Hexagon	Pentagon
Uniform polyhedron	Tetrahedron	Octahedron • Cube	Demicube		Dodecahedron • Icosahedron
Uniform polychoron	Pentachoron	16-cell • Tesseract	Demitesseract	24-cell	120-cell • 600-cell
Uniform 5-polytope	5-simplex	5-orthoplex • 5-cube	5-demicube		
Uniform 6-polytope	6-simplex	6-orthoplex • 6-cube	6-demicube	1_{22} • 2_{21}	
Uniform 7-polytope	7-simplex	7-orthoplex • 7-cube	7-demicube	1_{32} • 2_{31} • 3_{21}	
Uniform 8-polytope	8-simplex	8-orthoplex • 8-cube	8-demicube	1_{42} • 2_{41} • 4_{21}	
Uniform 9-polytope	9-simplex	9-orthoplex • 9-cube	9-demicube		
Uniform 10-polytope	10-simplex	10-orthoplex • 10-cube	10-demicube		
Uniform n-polytope	n-simplex	n-orthoplex • n-cube	n-demicube	1_{k2} • 2_{k1} • k_{21}	n-pentagonal polytope
Topics: Polytope families • Regular polytope • List of regular polytopes and compounds • Polytope operations
