= Rectified tesseract =

Rectified tesseract
Schlegel diagram Centered on cuboctahedron tetrahedral cells shown
| Type | Uniform 4-polytope | |
| Schläfli symbol | r{4,3,3} = $\left\{\begin{array}{l}4\\3,3\end{array}\right\}$ 2r{3,3^{1,1}} h_{3}{4,3,3} | |
| Coxeter-Dynkin diagrams | = | |
| Cells | 24 | 8 (3.4.3.4); 16 (3.3.3) |
| Faces | 88 | 64 {3} 24 {4} |
| Edges | 96 | |
| Vertices | 32 | |
| Vertex figure | (Elongated equilateral-triangular prism) | |
| Symmetry group | B_{4} [3,3,4], order 384; D_{4} [3^{1,1,1}], order 192 | |
| Properties | convex, edge-transitive | |
| Uniform index | 10 11 12 | |

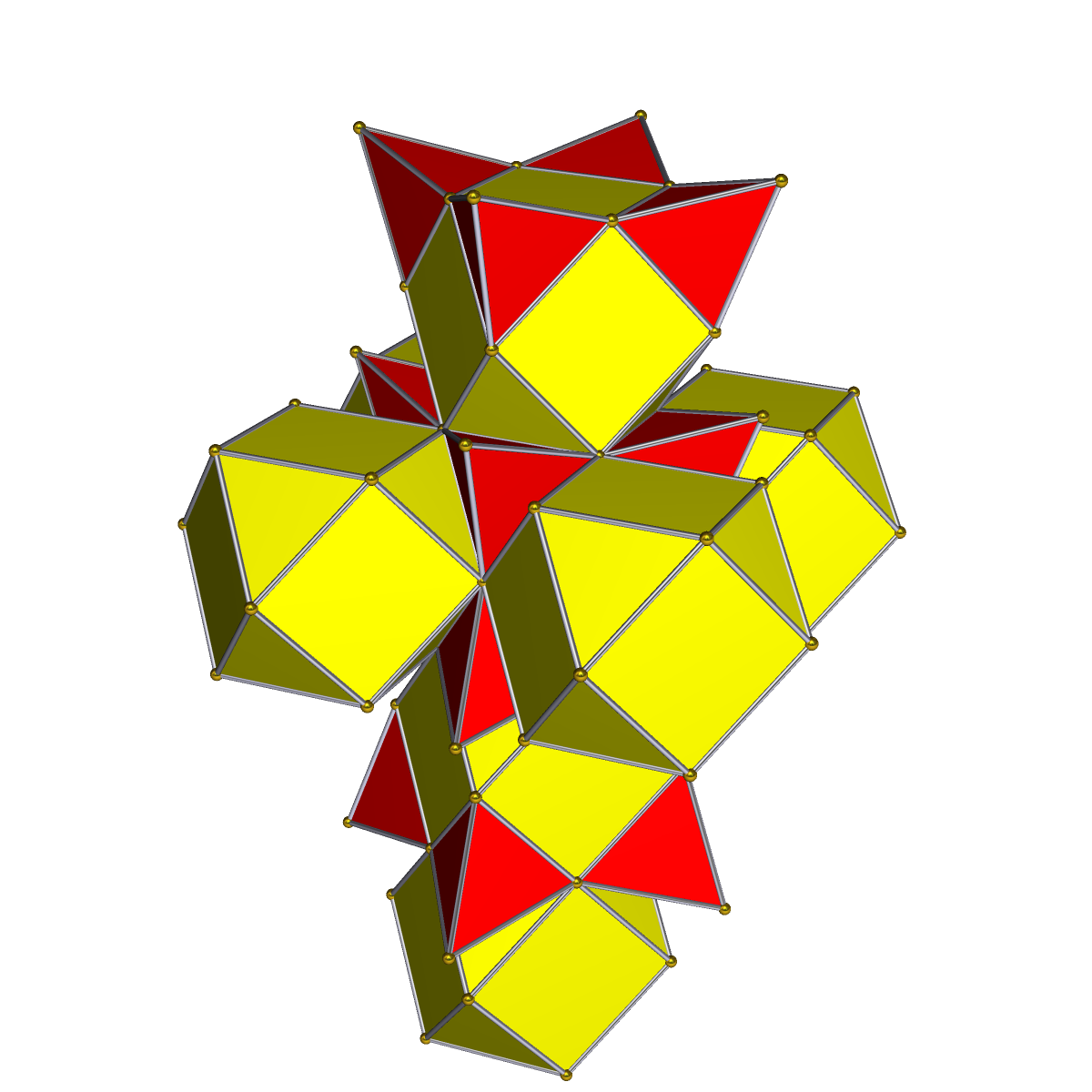
Net

In geometry, the rectified tesseract, rectified 8-cell is a uniform 4-polytope (4-dimensional polytope) bounded by 24 cells: 8 cuboctahedra, and 16 tetrahedra. It has half the vertices of a runcinated tesseract, with its construction, called a runcic tesseract.

It has two uniform constructions, as a rectified 8-cell r{4,3,3} and a cantellated demitesseract, rr{3,3^{1,1}}, the second alternating with two types of tetrahedral cells.

E. L. Elte identified it in 1912 as a semiregular polytope, labeling it as tC_{8}.

== Construction ==
The rectified tesseract may be constructed from the tesseract by truncating its vertices at the midpoints of its edges.

The Cartesian coordinates of the vertices of the rectified tesseract with edge length 2 is given by all permutations of:

$$(0,\ \pm\sqrt{2},\ \pm\sqrt{2},\ \pm\sqrt{2})$$

== Images ==
orthographic projections
| Coxeter plane | B_{4} | B_{3} / D_{4} / A_{2} | B_{2} / D_{3} |
|---|---|---|---|
| Graph | | | |
| Dihedral symmetry | [8] | [6] | [4] |
| Coxeter plane | F_{4} | A_{3} | |
| Graph | | | |
| Dihedral symmetry | [12/3] | [4] | |

| Wireframe | 16 tetrahedral cells |

== Projections ==
In the cuboctahedron-first parallel projection of the rectified tesseract into 3-dimensional space, the image has the following layout:

- The projection envelope is a cube.
- A cuboctahedron is inscribed in this cube, with its vertices lying at the midpoint of the cube's edges. The cuboctahedron is the image of two of the cuboctahedral cells.
- The remaining 6 cuboctahedral cells are projected to the square faces of the cube.
- The 8 tetrahedral volumes lying at the triangular faces of the central cuboctahedron are the images of the 16 tetrahedral cells, two cells to each image.

== Alternative names ==
- Rit (Jonathan Bowers: for rectified tesseract)
- Ambotesseract (Neil Sloane & John Horton Conway)
- Rectified tesseract/Runcic tesseract (Norman W. Johnson)
  - Runcic 4-hypercube/8-cell/octachoron/4-measure polytope/4-regular orthotope
  - Rectified 4-hypercube/8-cell/octachoron/4-measure polytope/4-regular orthotope

== Related uniform polytopes ==
=== Runcic cubic polytopes ===
Runcic n-cubes
| n | 4 | 5 | 6 | 7 | 8 |
| [1^{+},4,3^{n-2}] = [3,3^{n-3,1}] | [1^{+},4,3^{2}] = [3,3^{1,1}] | [1^{+},4,3^{3}] = [3,3^{2,1}] | [1^{+},4,3^{4}] = [3,3^{3,1}] | [1^{+},4,3^{5}] = [3,3^{4,1}] | [1^{+},4,3^{6}] = [3,3^{5,1}] |
|---|---|---|---|---|---|
| Runcic figure | | | | | |
| Coxeter | = | = | = | = | = |
| Schläfli | h_{3}{4,3^{2}} | h_{3}{4,3^{3}} | h_{3}{4,3^{4}} | h_{3}{4,3^{5}} | h_{3}{4,3^{6}} |

=== Tesseract polytopes ===
B4 symmetry polytopes
| Name | tesseract | rectified tesseract | truncated tesseract | cantellated tesseract | runcinated tesseract | bitruncated tesseract | cantitruncated tesseract | runcitruncated tesseract | omnitruncated tesseract |
| Coxeter diagram | | = | | | | = | | | |
| Schläfli symbol | {4,3,3} | t_{1}{4,3,3} r{4,3,3} | t_{0,1}{4,3,3} t{4,3,3} | t_{0,2}{4,3,3} rr{4,3,3} | t_{0,3}{4,3,3} | t_{1,2}{4,3,3} 2t{4,3,3} | t_{0,1,2}{4,3,3} tr{4,3,3} | t_{0,1,3}{4,3,3} | t_{0,1,2,3}{4,3,3} |
|---|---|---|---|---|---|---|---|---|---|
| Schlegel diagram | | | | | | | | | |
| B_{4} | | | | | | | | | |
| Name | 16-cell | rectified 16-cell | truncated 16-cell | cantellated 16-cell | runcinated 16-cell | bitruncated 16-cell | cantitruncated 16-cell | runcitruncated 16-cell | omnitruncated 16-cell |
| Coxeter diagram | = | = | = | = | | = | = | | |
| Schläfli symbol | {3,3,4} | t_{1}{3,3,4} r{3,3,4} | t_{0,1}{3,3,4} t{3,3,4} | t_{0,2}{3,3,4} rr{3,3,4} | t_{0,3}{3,3,4} | t_{1,2}{3,3,4} 2t{3,3,4} | t_{0,1,2}{3,3,4} tr{3,3,4} | t_{0,1,3}{3,3,4} | t_{0,1,2,3}{3,3,4} |
| Schlegel diagram | | | | | | | | | |
| B_{4} | | | | | | | | | |

Fundamental convex regular and uniform polytopes in dimensions 2–10
| Family | A_{n} | B_{n} | I_{2}(p) / D_{n} | E_{6} / E_{7} / E_{8} / F_{4} / G_{2} | H_{n} |
| Regular polygon | Triangle | Square | p-gon | Hexagon | Pentagon |
| Uniform polyhedron | Tetrahedron | Octahedron • Cube | Demicube | | Dodecahedron • Icosahedron |
| Uniform polychoron | Pentachoron | 16-cell • Tesseract | Demitesseract | 24-cell | 120-cell • 600-cell |
| Uniform 5-polytope | 5-simplex | 5-orthoplex • 5-cube | 5-demicube | | |
| Uniform 6-polytope | 6-simplex | 6-orthoplex • 6-cube | 6-demicube | 1_{22} • 2_{21} | |
| Uniform 7-polytope | 7-simplex | 7-orthoplex • 7-cube | 7-demicube | 1_{32} • 2_{31} • 3_{21} | |
| Uniform 8-polytope | 8-simplex | 8-orthoplex • 8-cube | 8-demicube | 1_{42} • 2_{41} • 4_{21} | |
| Uniform 9-polytope | 9-simplex | 9-orthoplex • 9-cube | 9-demicube | | |
| Uniform 10-polytope | 10-simplex | 10-orthoplex • 10-cube | 10-demicube | | |
| Uniform n-polytope | n-simplex | n-orthoplex • n-cube | n-demicube | 1_{k2} • 2_{k1} • k_{21} | n-pentagonal polytope |
Topics: Polytope families • Regular polytope • List of regular polytopes and compounds
