= Rectified 24-cell =

Rectified 24-cell
Schlegel diagram 8 of 24 cuboctahedral cells shown
| Type | Uniform 4-polytope | |
| Schläfli symbols | r{3,4,3} = $\left\{\begin{array}{l}3\\4,3\end{array}\right\}$ rr{3,3,4}=$r\left\{\begin{array}{l}3\\3,4\end{array}\right\}$ r{3^{1,1,1}} = $r\left\{\begin{array}{l}3\\3\\3\end{array}\right\}$ | |
| Coxeter diagrams | or | |
| Cells | 48 | 24 3.4.3.4; 24 4.4.4 |
| Faces | 240 | 96 {3} 144 {4} |
| Edges | 288 | |
| Vertices | 96 | |
| Vertex figure | Triangular prism | |
| Symmetry groups | F_{4} [3,4,3], order 1152; B_{4} [3,3,4], order 384; D_{4} [3^{1,1,1}], order 192 | |
| Properties | convex, edge-transitive | |
| Uniform index | 22 23 24 | |

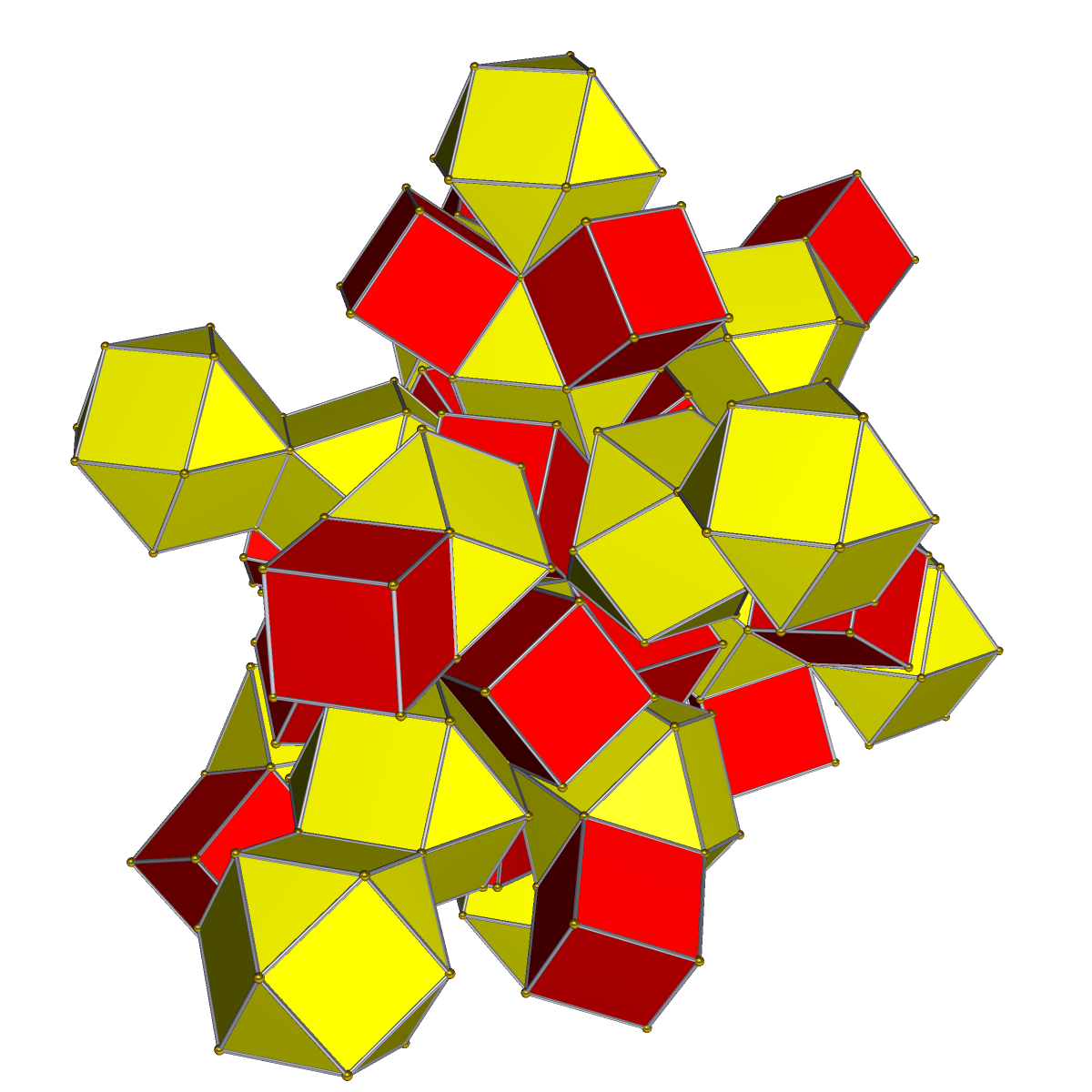
Net

In geometry, the rectified 24-cell or rectified icositetrachoron is a uniform 4-dimensional polytope (or uniform 4-polytope), which is bounded by 48 cells: 24 cubes, and 24 cuboctahedra. It can be obtained by rectification of the 24-cell, reducing its octahedral cells to cubes and cuboctahedra.

E. L. Elte identified it in 1912 as a semiregular polytope, labeling it as tC_{24}.

It can also be considered a cantellated 16-cell with the lower symmetries B_{4} = [3,3,4]. B_{4} would lead to a bicoloring of the cuboctahedral cells into 8 and 16 each. It is also called a runcicantellated demitesseract in a D_{4} symmetry, giving 3 colors of cells, 8 for each.

== Construction ==
The rectified 24-cell can be derived from the 24-cell by the process of rectification: the 24-cell is truncated at the midpoints. The vertices become cubes, while the octahedra become cuboctahedra.

== Cartesian coordinates ==
A rectified 24-cell having an edge length of √2 has vertices given by all permutations and sign permutations of the following Cartesian coordinates:

(0,1,1,2) [4!/2!×2^{3} = 96 vertices]

The dual configuration with edge length 2 has all coordinate and sign permutations of:

(0,2,2,2) [4×2^{3} = 32 vertices]
(1,1,1,3) [4×2^{4} = 64 vertices]

== Images ==
orthographic projections
| Coxeter plane | F_{4} | |
|---|---|---|
| Graph | | |
| Dihedral symmetry | [12] | |
| Coxeter plane | B_{3} / A_{2} (a) | B_{3} / A_{2} (b) |
| Graph | | |
| Dihedral symmetry | [6] | [6] |
| Coxeter plane | B_{4} | B_{2} / A_{3} |
| Graph | | |
| Dihedral symmetry | [8] | [4] |

Stereographic projection
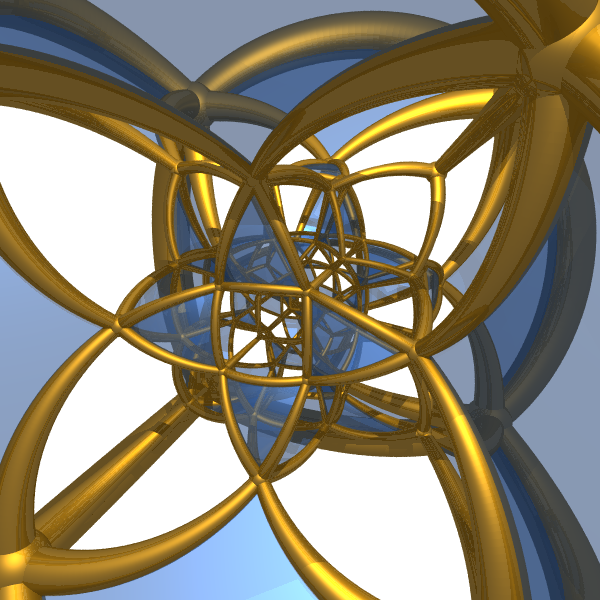

Center of stereographic projection
with 96 triangular faces blue

== Symmetry constructions ==
There are three different symmetry constructions of this polytope. The lowest ${D}_4$ construction can be doubled into ${C}_4$ by adding a mirror that maps the bifurcating nodes onto each other. ${D}_4$ can be mapped up to ${F}_4$ symmetry by adding two mirror that map all three end nodes together.

The vertex figure is a triangular prism, containing two cubes and three cuboctahedra. The three symmetries can be seen with 3 colored cuboctahedra in the lowest ${D}_4$ construction, and two colors (1:2 ratio) in ${C}_4$, and all identical cuboctahedra in ${F}_4$.

| Coxeter group | ${F}_4$ = [3,4,3] | ${C}_4$ = [4,3,3] | ${D}_4$ = [3,3^{1,1}] |
|---|---|---|---|
| Order | 1152 | 384 | 192 |
| Full symmetry group | [3,4,3] | [4,3,3] | <[3,3^{1,1}]> = [4,3,3] [3[3^{1,1,1}]] = [3,4,3] |
| Coxeter diagram | | | |
| Facets | 3: 2: | 2,2: 2: | 1,1,1: 2: |
| Vertex figure | | | |

== Alternate names ==
- Rectified 24-cell, Cantellated 16-cell (Norman Johnson)
- Rectified icositetrachoron (Acronym rico) (George Olshevsky, Jonathan Bowers)
  - Cantellated hexadecachoron
- Disicositetrachoron
- Amboicositetrachoron (Neil Sloane & John Horton Conway)

== Related polytopes ==
The convex hull of the rectified 24-cell and its dual (assuming that they are congruent) is a nonuniform polychoron composed of 192 cells: 48 cubes, 144 square antiprisms, and 192 vertices. Its vertex figure is a triangular bifrustum.

== Related uniform polytopes ==
D_{4} uniform polychora
| {3,3^{1,1}} h{4,3,3} | 2r{3,3^{1,1}} h_{3}{4,3,3} | t{3,3^{1,1}} h_{2}{4,3,3} | 2t{3,3^{1,1}} h_{2,3}{4,3,3} | r{3,3^{1,1}} {3^{1,1,1}}={3,4,3} | rr{3,3^{1,1}} r{3^{1,1,1}}=r{3,4,3} | tr{3,3^{1,1}} t{3^{1,1,1}}=t{3,4,3} | sr{3,3^{1,1}} s{3^{1,1,1}}=s{3,4,3} |

24-cell family polytopes
| Name | 24-cell | truncated 24-cell | snub 24-cell | rectified 24-cell | cantellated 24-cell | bitruncated 24-cell | cantitruncated 24-cell | runcinated 24-cell | runcitruncated 24-cell | omnitruncated 24-cell |
| Schläfli symbol | {3,4,3} | t_{0,1}{3,4,3} t{3,4,3} | s{3,4,3} | t_{1}{3,4,3} r{3,4,3} | t_{0,2}{3,4,3} rr{3,4,3} | t_{1,2}{3,4,3} 2t{3,4,3} | t_{0,1,2}{3,4,3} tr{3,4,3} | t_{0,3}{3,4,3} | t_{0,1,3}{3,4,3} | t_{0,1,2,3}{3,4,3} |
| Coxeter diagram | | | | | | | | | | |
|---|---|---|---|---|---|---|---|---|---|---|
| Schlegel diagram | | | | | | | | | | |
| F_{4} | | | | | | | | | | |
| B_{4} | | | | | | | | | | |
| B_{3}(a) | | | | | | | | | | |
| B_{3}(b) | | | | | | | | | | |
| B_{2} | | | | | | | | | | |

The rectified 24-cell can also be derived as a cantellated 16-cell:

B4 symmetry polytopes
| Name | tesseract | rectified tesseract | truncated tesseract | cantellated tesseract | runcinated tesseract | bitruncated tesseract | cantitruncated tesseract | runcitruncated tesseract | omnitruncated tesseract |
| Coxeter diagram | | = | | | | = | | | |
| Schläfli symbol | {4,3,3} | t_{1}{4,3,3} r{4,3,3} | t_{0,1}{4,3,3} t{4,3,3} | t_{0,2}{4,3,3} rr{4,3,3} | t_{0,3}{4,3,3} | t_{1,2}{4,3,3} 2t{4,3,3} | t_{0,1,2}{4,3,3} tr{4,3,3} | t_{0,1,3}{4,3,3} | t_{0,1,2,3}{4,3,3} |
|---|---|---|---|---|---|---|---|---|---|
| Schlegel diagram | | | | | | | | | |
| B_{4} | | | | | | | | | |
| Name | 16-cell | rectified 16-cell | truncated 16-cell | cantellated 16-cell | runcinated 16-cell | bitruncated 16-cell | cantitruncated 16-cell | runcitruncated 16-cell | omnitruncated 16-cell |
| Coxeter diagram | = | = | = | = | | = | = | | |
| Schläfli symbol | {3,3,4} | t_{1}{3,3,4} r{3,3,4} | t_{0,1}{3,3,4} t{3,3,4} | t_{0,2}{3,3,4} rr{3,3,4} | t_{0,3}{3,3,4} | t_{1,2}{3,3,4} 2t{3,3,4} | t_{0,1,2}{3,3,4} tr{3,3,4} | t_{0,1,3}{3,3,4} | t_{0,1,2,3}{3,3,4} |
| Schlegel diagram | | | | | | | | | |
| B_{4} | | | | | | | | | |

== Citations ==
Fundamental convex regular and uniform polytopes in dimensions 2–10
| Family | A_{n} | B_{n} | I_{2}(p) / D_{n} | E_{6} / E_{7} / E_{8} / F_{4} / G_{2} | H_{n} |
| Regular polygon | Triangle | Square | p-gon | Hexagon | Pentagon |
| Uniform polyhedron | Tetrahedron | Octahedron • Cube | Demicube | | Dodecahedron • Icosahedron |
| Uniform polychoron | Pentachoron | 16-cell • Tesseract | Demitesseract | 24-cell | 120-cell • 600-cell |
| Uniform 5-polytope | 5-simplex | 5-orthoplex • 5-cube | 5-demicube | | |
| Uniform 6-polytope | 6-simplex | 6-orthoplex • 6-cube | 6-demicube | 1_{22} • 2_{21} | |
| Uniform 7-polytope | 7-simplex | 7-orthoplex • 7-cube | 7-demicube | 1_{32} • 2_{31} • 3_{21} | |
| Uniform 8-polytope | 8-simplex | 8-orthoplex • 8-cube | 8-demicube | 1_{42} • 2_{41} • 4_{21} | |
| Uniform 9-polytope | 9-simplex | 9-orthoplex • 9-cube | 9-demicube | | |
| Uniform 10-polytope | 10-simplex | 10-orthoplex • 10-cube | 10-demicube | | |
| Uniform n-polytope | n-simplex | n-orthoplex • n-cube | n-demicube | 1_{k2} • 2_{k1} • k_{21} | n-pentagonal polytope |
Topics: Polytope families • Regular polytope • List of regular polytopes and compounds
