= 16-cell =

Four-dimensional analog of the octahedron

16-cell (4-orthoplex)
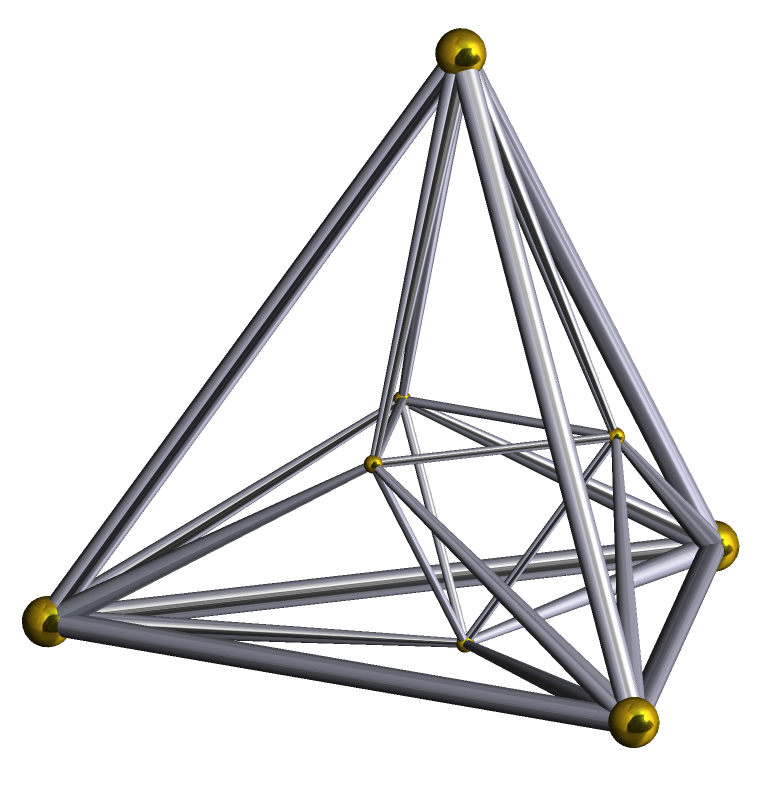
- Schlegel diagram (vertices and edges)
- Type: Convex regular 4-polytope 4-orthoplex 4-demicube
- Schläfli symbol: {3,3,4}
- Cells: 16 {3,3}
- Faces: 32 {3}
- Edges: 24
- Vertices: 8
- Vertex figure: Octahedron
- Petrie polygon: octagon
- Coxeter group: B_{4}, [3,3,4], order 384; D_{4}, order 192
- Dual: Tesseract
- Properties: convex, isogonal, isotoxal, isohedral, regular, Hanner polytope
- Uniform index: 12

In geometry, the 16-cell is the regular convex 4-polytope (four-dimensional analogue of a Platonic solid) with Schläfli symbol {3,3,4}. It is an 8-vertex four-dimensional object bounded by 16 tetrahedral cells, with a total of 24 edges and 32 triangular faces. It is one of the six regular convex 4-polytopes first described by the Swiss mathematician Ludwig Schläfli in the mid-19th century. It is also called C_{16}, hexadecachoron, or hexdecahedroid [sic?].

It is the 4-dimensional member of an infinite family of polytopes called cross-polytopes, orthoplexes, or hyperoctahedrons which are analogous to the octahedron in three dimensions. It is Coxeter's $\beta_4$ polytope. The dual polytope is the tesseract (4-cube), which it can be combined with to form a compound figure, the 24-cell. The cells of the 16-cell are dual to the 16 vertices of the tesseract.

== Geometry ==
The 16-cell is the second in the sequence of 6 convex regular 4-polytopes (in order of size and complexity). (Note: The convex regular 4-polytopes can be ordered by size as a measure of 4-dimensional content (hypervolume) for the same radius. Each greater polytope in the sequence is rounder than its predecessor, enclosing more content within the same radius. The 4-simplex (5-cell) is the smallest case, and the 120-cell is the largest. Complexity (as measured by comparing configuration matrices or simply the number of vertices) follows the same ordering. This provides an alternative numerical naming scheme for regular polytopes in which the 16-cell is the 8-point 4-polytope: second in the ascending sequence that runs from 5-point 4-polytope to 600-point 4-polytope.)

Each of its 4 successor convex regular 4-polytopes can be constructed as the convex hull of a polytope compound of multiple 16-cells: the 16-vertex tesseract as a compound of two 16-cells, the 24-vertex 24-cell as a compound of three 16-cells, the 120-vertex 600-cell as a compound of fifteen 16-cells, and the 600-vertex 120-cell as a compound of seventy-five 16-cells. (Note: There are 2 and only 2 16-cells inscribed in the 8-cell (tesseract), 3 and only 3 16-cells inscribed in the 24-cell, 75 distinct 16-cells (but only 15 disjoint 16-cells) inscribed in the 600-cell, and 675 distinct 16-cells (but only 75 disjoint 16-cells) inscribed in the 120-cell.)

Regular convex 4-polytopes
Symmetry group	A_{4}	B_{4}		F_{4}	H_{4}	
Name	5-cell Hyper-tetrahedron; 5-point	16-cell Hyper-octahedron; 8-point	8-cell Hyper-cube; 16-point	24-cell 24-point	600-cell Hyper-icosahedron; 120-point	120-cell Hyper-dodecahedron; 600-point
Schläfli symbol	{3, 3, 3}	{3, 3, 4}	{4, 3, 3}	{3, 4, 3}	{3, 3, 5}	{5, 3, 3}
Coxeter mirrors						
Mirror dihedrals	𝝅/3 𝝅/3 𝝅/3 𝝅/2 𝝅/2 𝝅/2	𝝅/3 𝝅/3 𝝅/4 𝝅/2 𝝅/2 𝝅/2	𝝅/4 𝝅/3 𝝅/3 𝝅/2 𝝅/2 𝝅/2	𝝅/3 𝝅/4 𝝅/3 𝝅/2 𝝅/2 𝝅/2	𝝅/3 𝝅/3 𝝅/5 𝝅/2 𝝅/2 𝝅/2	𝝅/5 𝝅/3 𝝅/3 𝝅/2 𝝅/2 𝝅/2
Graph						
Vertices	5 tetrahedral	8 octahedral	16 tetrahedral	24 cubical	120 icosahedral	600 tetrahedral
Edges	10 triangular	24 square	32 triangular	96 triangular	720 pentagonal	1200 triangular
Faces	10 triangles	32 triangles	24 squares	96 triangles	1200 triangles	720 pentagons
Cells	5 tetrahedra	16 tetrahedra	8 cubes	24 octahedra	600 tetrahedra	120 dodecahedra
Tori	1 5-tetrahedron	2 8-tetrahedron	2 4-cube	4 6-octahedron	20 30-tetrahedron	12 10-dodecahedron
Inscribed	120 in 120-cell	675 in 120-cell	2 16-cells	3 8-cells	25 24-cells	10 600-cells
Great polygons		2 squares x 3	4 rectangles x 4	4 hexagons x 4	12 decagons x 6	100 irregular hexagons x 4
Petrie polygons	1 pentagon x 2	1 octagon x 3	2 octagons x 4	2 dodecagons x 4	4 30-gons x 6	20 30-gons x 4
Long radius	$1$	$1$	$1$	$1$	$1$	$1$
Edge length	$\sqrt{\tfrac{5}{2}} \approx 1.581$	$\sqrt{2} \approx 1.414$	$1$	$1$	$\tfrac{1}{\phi} \approx 0.618$	$\tfrac{1}{\phi^2\sqrt{2}} \approx 0.270$
Short radius	$\tfrac{1}{4}$	$\tfrac{1}{2}$	$\tfrac{1}{2}$	$\sqrt{\tfrac{1}{2}} \approx 0.707$	$\sqrt{\tfrac{\phi^4}{8}} \approx 0.926$	$\sqrt{\tfrac{\phi^4}{8}} \approx 0.926$
Area	$10\left(\tfrac{5\sqrt{3}}{8}\right) \approx 10.825$	$32\left(\sqrt{\tfrac{3}{4}}\right) \approx 27.713$	$24$	$96\left(\sqrt{\tfrac{3}{16}}\right) \approx 41.569$	$1200\left(\tfrac{\sqrt{3}}{4\phi^2}\right) \approx 198.48$	$720\left(\tfrac{\sqrt{25+10\sqrt{5}}}{8\phi^4}\right) \approx 90.366$
Volume	$5\left(\tfrac{5\sqrt{5}}{24}\right) \approx 2.329$	$16\left(\tfrac{1}{3}\right) \approx 5.333$	$8$	$24\left(\tfrac{\sqrt{2}}{3}\right) \approx 11.314$	$600\left(\tfrac{\sqrt{2}}{12\phi^3}\right) \approx 16.693$	$120\left(\tfrac{15 + 7\sqrt{5}}{4\phi^6\sqrt{8}}\right) \approx 18.118$
4-Content	$\tfrac{\sqrt{5}}{24}\left(\tfrac{\sqrt{5}}{2}\right)^4 \approx 0.146$	$\tfrac{2}{3} \approx 0.667$	$1$	$2$	$\tfrac{\text{Short}\times\text{Vol}}{4} \approx 3.863$	$\tfrac{\text{Short}\times\text{Vol}}{4} \approx 4.193$

=== Coordinates ===
Disjoint squares

xy plane
( 0, 1, 0, 0)	( 0, 0,-1, 0)
( 0, 0, 1, 0)	( 0,-1, 0, 0)

wz plane
( 1, 0, 0, 0)	( 0, 0, 0,-1)
( 0, 0, 0, 1)	(-1, 0, 0, 0)

The 16-cell is the 4-dimensional cross polytope (4-orthoplex), which means its vertices lie in opposite pairs on the 4 axes of a (w, x, y, z) Cartesian coordinate system.

The eight vertices are (±1, 0, 0, 0), (0, ±1, 0, 0), (0, 0, ±1, 0), (0, 0, 0, ±1). All vertices are connected by edges except opposite pairs. The edge length is √2.

The vertex coordinates form 6 orthogonal central squares lying in the 6 coordinate planes. Squares in opposite planes that do not share an axis (e.g. in the xy and wz planes) are completely disjoint (they do not intersect at any vertices). These planes are completely orthogonal. (Note: In 4 dimensional space we can construct 4 perpendicular axes and 6 perpendicular planes through a point. Without loss of generality, we may take these to be the axes and orthogonal central planes of a (w, x, y, z) Cartesian coordinate system. In 4 dimensions we have the same 3 orthogonal planes (xy, xz, yz) that we have in 3 dimensions, and also 3 others (wx, wy, wz). Each of the 6 orthogonal planes shares an axis with 4 of the others, and is opposite or completely orthogonal to just one of the others: the only one with which it does not share an axis. Thus there are 3 pairs of completely orthogonal planes: xy and wz intersect only at the origin; xz and wy intersect only at the origin; yz and wx intersect only at the origin.)

The 16-cell constitutes an orthonormal basis for the choice of a 4-dimensional reference frame, because its vertices exactly define the four orthogonal axes.

=== Structure ===
The Schläfli symbol of the 16-cell is {3,3,4}, indicating that its cells are regular tetrahedra {3,3} and its vertex figure is a regular octahedron {3,4}. There are 8 tetrahedra, 12 triangles, and 6 edges meeting at every vertex. Its edge figure is a square. There are 4 tetrahedra and 4 triangles meeting at every edge.

The 16-cell is bounded by 16 cells, all of which are regular tetrahedra. (Note: The boundary surface of a 16-cell is a finite 3-dimensional space consisting of 16 tetrahedra arranged face-to-face (four around one). It is a closed, tightly curved (non-Euclidean) 3-space, within which we can move straight through 4 tetrahedra in any direction and arrive back in the tetrahedron where we started. We can visualize moving around inside this tetrahedral jungle gym, climbing from one tetrahedron into another on its 24 struts (its edges), and never being able to get out (or see out) of the 16 tetrahedra no matter what direction we go (or look). We are always on (or in) the surface of the 16-cell, never inside the 16-cell itself (nor outside it). We can see that the 6 edges around each vertex radiate symmetrically in 3 dimensions and form an orthogonal 3-axis cross, just as the radii of an octahedron do (so we say the vertex figure of the 16-cell is the octahedron). (Note: Each vertex in the 16-cell is the apex of an octahedral pyramid, the base of which is the octahedron formed by the 6 other vertices to which the apex is connected by edges. The 16-cell can be deconstructed (four different ways) into two octahedral pyramids by cutting it in half through one of its four octahedral central hyperplanes. Looked at from inside the curved 3 dimensional volume of its boundary surface of 16 face-bonded tetrahedra, the 16-cell's vertex figure is an octahedron. In 4 dimensions, the vertex octahedron is actually an octahedral pyramid. The apex of the octahedral pyramid (the vertex where the 6 edges meet) is not actually at the center of the octahedron: it is displaced radially outwards in the fourth dimension, out of the hyperplane defined by the octahedron's 6 vertices. The 6 edges around the vertex make an orthogonal 3-axis cross in 3 dimensions (and in the 3-dimensional projection of the 4-pyramid), but the 3 lines are actually bent 90 degrees in the fourth dimension where they meet in an apex.)) It has 32 triangular faces, 24 edges, and 8 vertices. The 24 edges bound 6 orthogonal central squares lying on great circles in the 6 coordinate planes (3 pairs of completely orthogonal great squares). At each vertex, 3 great squares cross perpendicularly. The 6 edges meet at the vertex the way 6 edges meet at the apex of a canonical octahedral pyramid. The 6 orthogonal central planes of the 16-cell can be divided into 4 orthogonal central hyperplanes (3-spaces) each forming an octahedron with 3 orthogonal great squares.

=== Rotations ===
A 3D projection of a 16-cell performing a simple rotation	A 3D projection of a 16-cell performing a double rotation

Rotations in 4-dimensional Euclidean space can be seen as the composition of two 2-dimensional rotations in completely orthogonal planes. The 16-cell is a simple frame in which to observe 4-dimensional rotations, because each of the 16-cell's 6 great squares has another completely orthogonal great square (there are 3 pairs of completely orthogonal squares). The characteristic rotation of the 16-cell is parameterized by an angle and direction of rotation in one of its great square planes (e.g. the xy plane) and another angle and direction of rotation in the completely orthogonal great square plane (e.g. the wz plane). (Note: Each great square vertex is √2 distant from two of the square's other vertices, and √4 distant from its opposite vertex. The other four vertices of the 16-cell (also √2 distant) are the vertices of the square's completely orthogonal square. (Note: Completely orthogonal great squares are non-intersecting and rotate independently because the great circles on which their vertices lie are Clifford parallel. (Note: Clifford parallels are non-intersecting curved lines that are parallel in the sense that the perpendicular (shortest) distance between them is the same at each point. A double helix is an example of Clifford parallelism in ordinary 3-dimensional Euclidean space. In 4-space Clifford parallels occur as geodesic great circles on the 3-sphere. In the 16-cell the corresponding vertices of completely orthogonal great circle squares are all √2 apart, so these squares are Clifford parallel polygons. Note that only the vertices of the great squares (the points on the great circle) are √2 apart; points on the edges of the squares (on chords of the circle) are closer together.) They are √2 apart at each pair of nearest vertices (and in the 16-cell all the pairs except antipodal pairs are nearest). The two squares cannot intersect at all because they lie in planes which intersect at only one point: the center of the 16-cell. Because they are perpendicular and share a common center, the two squares are obviously not parallel and separate in the usual way of parallel squares in 3 dimensions; rather they are connected like adjacent square links in a chain, each passing through the other without intersecting at any points, forming a Hopf link.) Each 16-cell vertex is a vertex of three orthogonal great squares which intersect there. Each of them has a different completely orthogonal square. Thus there are three great squares completely orthogonal to each vertex: squares that the vertex is not part of. (Note: The three incompletely orthogonal great squares which intersect at each vertex of the 16-cell form the vertex's octahedral vertex figure. Any two of them, together with the completely orthogonal square of the third, also form an octahedron: a central octahedral hyperplane. (Note: Three great squares meet at each vertex (and at its opposite vertex) in the 16-cell. Each great square has a different completely orthogonal great square. Thus there are three great squares completely orthogonal to each vertex and its opposite vertex (each axis). They form an octahedron (a central hyperplane). Every axis line in the 16-cell is completely orthogonal to a central octahedron hyperplane, as every great square plane is completely orthogonal to another great square plane. The axis and the octahedron intersect only at one point (the center of the 16-cell), as each pair of completely orthogonal great squares intersects only at one point (the center of the 16-cell). Each central octahedron is also the octahedral vertex figure of two of the eight vertices: the two on its completely orthogonal axis.) In the 16-cell, each octahedral vertex figure is also a central octahedral hyperplane.)) Completely orthogonal great squares have disjoint vertices: 4 of the 16-cell's 8 vertices rotate in one plane, and the other 4 rotate independently in the completely orthogonal plane.

In 2 or 3 dimensions a rotation is characterized by a single plane of rotation; this kind of rotation taking place in 4-space is called a simple rotation, in which only one of the two completely orthogonal planes rotates (the angle of rotation in the other plane is 0). In the 16-cell, a simple rotation in one of the 6 orthogonal planes moves only 4 of the 8 vertices; the other 4 remain fixed. (In the simple rotation animation above, all 8 vertices move because the plane of rotation is not one of the 6 orthogonal basis planes.)

In a double rotation both sets of 4 vertices move, but independently: the angles of rotation may be different in the 2 completely orthogonal planes. If the two angles happen to be the same, a maximally symmetric isoclinic rotation takes place. (Note: In an isoclinic rotation, all 6 orthogonal planes are displaced in two orthogonal directions at once: they are rotated by the same angle, and at the same time they are tilted sideways by that same angle. An isoclinic displacement (also known as a Clifford displacement) is 4-dimensionally diagonal. Points are displaced an equal distance in four orthogonal directions at once, and displaced a total Pythagorean distance equal to the square root of four times the square of that distance. For example, when the unit-radius 16-cell rotates isoclinically 90° in a great square invariant plane, it also rotates 90° in the completely orthogonal great square invariant plane. The great square plane also tilts sideways 90° to occupy its completely orthogonal plane. (By isoclinic symmetry, every great square rotates 90° and tilts sideways 90° into its completely orthogonal plane.) Each vertex (in every great square) is displaced a distance of √2/2 in each of four orthogonal directions, a total distance of √2, to a vertex in its completely orthogonal great square.) In the 16-cell an isoclinic rotation by 90 degrees of any pair of completely orthogonal square planes takes every square plane to its completely orthogonal square plane in a twisting displacement. All the vertices move at once on separate circular geodesics, displaced 90° in 8 orthogonal directions, and the rigid 16-cell assumes a new orientation in 4-space. After 360° of rotation each vertex reaches its antipodal position. In the course of a 720° isoclinic rotation each vertex departs from all 8 vertex positions just once and returns to its original position, and the 16-cell returns to its original orientation.

=== Constructions ===
==== Octahedral dipyramid ====
Octahedron $\beta_3$	16-cell $\beta_4$
Orthogonal projections to skew hexagon hyperplane

The simplest construction of the 16-cell is on the 3-dimensional cross polytope, the octahedron. The octahedron has 3 perpendicular axes and 6 vertices in 3 opposite pairs (its Petrie polygon is the hexagon). Add another pair of vertices, on a fourth axis perpendicular to all 3 of the other axes. Connect each new vertex to all 6 of the original vertices, adding 12 new edges. This raises two octahedral pyramids on a shared octahedron base that lies in the 16-cell's central hyperplane.

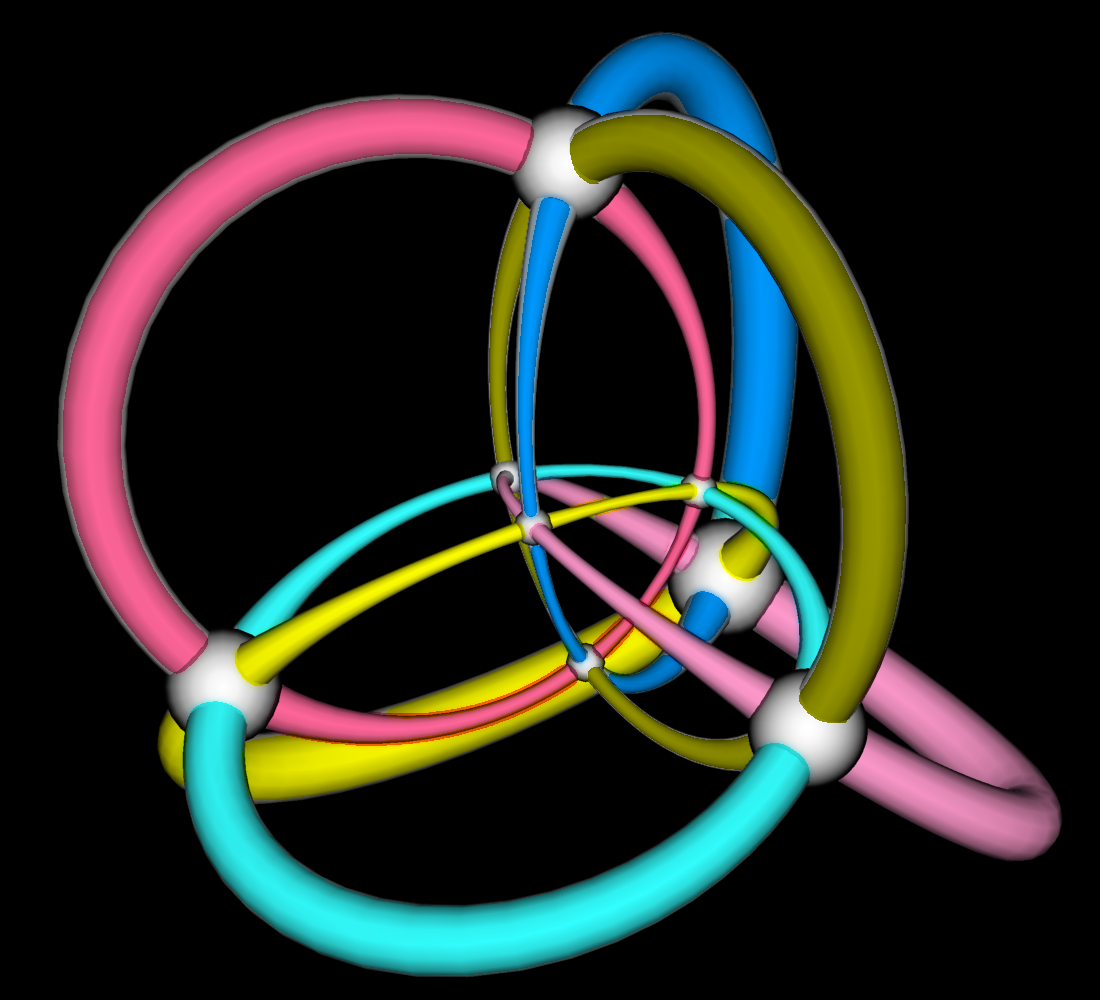
Stereographic projection of the 16-cell's 6 orthogonal central squares onto their great circles. Each circle is divided into 4 arc-edges at the intersections where 3 circles cross perpendicularly. Notice that each circle has one Clifford parallel circle that it does not intersect. Those two circles pass through each other like adjacent links in a chain.

The octahedron that the construction starts with has three perpendicular intersecting squares (which appear as rectangles in the hexagonal projections). Each square intersects with each of the other squares at two opposite vertices, with two of the squares crossing at each vertex. Then two more points are added in the fourth dimension (above and below the 3-dimensional hyperplane). These new vertices are connected to all the octahedron's vertices, creating 12 new edges and three more squares (which appear edge-on as the 3 diameters of the hexagon in the projection), and three more octahedra.

Something unprecedented has also been created. Notice that each square no longer intersects with all of the other squares: it does intersect with four of them (with three of the squares crossing at each vertex now), but each square has one other square with which it shares no vertices: it is not directly connected to that square at all. These two separate perpendicular squares (there are three pairs of them) are like the opposite edges of a tetrahedron: perpendicular, but non-intersecting. They lie opposite each other (parallel in some sense), and they don't touch, but they also pass through each other like two perpendicular links in a chain (but unlike links in a chain they have a common center). They are an example of Clifford parallels, and the 16-cell is the simplest regular polytope in which they occur. Clifford parallelism of objects of more than one dimension (more than just curved lines) emerges here and occurs in all the subsequent 4-dimensional regular polytopes, where it can be seen as the defining relationship among disjoint concentric regular 4-polytopes and their corresponding parts. It can occur between congruent (similar) polytopes of 2 or more dimensions. For example, as noted above all the subsequent convex regular 4-polytopes are compounds of multiple 16-cells; those 16-cells are Clifford parallel polytopes.

==== Tetrahedral constructions ====
The 16-cell has two Wythoff constructions from regular tetrahedra, a regular form and alternated form, shown here as nets, the second represented by tetrahedral cells of two alternating colors. The alternated form is a lower symmetry construction of the 16-cell called the demitesseract.

Wythoff's construction replicates the 16-cell's characteristic 5-cell in a kaleidoscope of mirrors. Every regular 4-polytope has its characteristic 4-orthoscheme, an irregular 5-cell. (Note: An orthoscheme is a chiral irregular simplex with right triangle faces that is characteristic of some polytope if it will exactly fill that polytope with the reflections of itself in its own facets (its mirror walls). Every regular polytope can be dissected radially into instances of its characteristic orthoscheme surrounding its center. The characteristic orthoscheme has the shape described by the same Coxeter-Dynkin diagram as the regular polytope without the generating point ring.) There are three regular 4-polytopes with tetrahedral cells: the 5-cell, the 16-cell, and the 600-cell. Although all are bounded by regular tetrahedron cells, their characteristic 5-cells (4-orthoschemes) are different tetrahedral pyramids, all based on the same characteristic irregular tetrahedron. They share the same characteristic tetrahedron (3-orthoscheme) and characteristic right triangle (2-orthoscheme) because they have the same kind of cell. (Note: A regular polytope of dimension k has a characteristic k-orthoscheme, and also a characteristic (k-1)-orthoscheme. A regular 4-polytope has a characteristic 5-cell (4-orthoscheme) into which it is subdivided by its (3-dimensional) hyperplanes of symmetry, and also a characteristic tetrahedron (3-orthoscheme) into which its surface is subdivided by its cells' (2-dimensional) planes of symmetry. After subdividing its (3-dimensional) surface into characteristic tetrahedra surrounding each cell center, its (4-dimensional) interior can be subdivided into characteristic 5-cells by adding radii joining the vertices of the surface characteristic tetrahedra to the 4-polytope's center. The interior tetrahedra and triangles thus formed will also be orthoschemes.)

Characteristics of the 16-cell
	edge	arc		dihedral	
𝒍	$\sqrt{2} \approx 1.414$	90°	$\tfrac{\pi}{2}$	120°	$\tfrac{2\pi}{3}$
𝟀	$\sqrt{\tfrac{2}{3}} \approx 0.816$	60″	$\tfrac{\pi}{3}$	60°	$\tfrac{\pi}{3}$
𝝉 (Note: (Coxeter 1973) uses the Greek letter 𝝓 (phi) to represent one of the three characteristic angles 𝟀, 𝝓, 𝟁 of a regular polytope. Because 𝝓 is commonly used to represent the golden ratio constant ≈ 1.618, for which Coxeter uses 𝝉 (tau), we reverse Coxeter's conventions, and use 𝝉 to represent the characteristic angle.)	$\sqrt{\tfrac{1}{2}} \approx 0.707$	45″	$\tfrac{\pi}{4}$	45°	$\tfrac{\pi}{4}$
𝟁	$\sqrt{\tfrac{1}{6}} \approx 0.408$	30″	$\tfrac{\pi}{6}$	60°	$\tfrac{\pi}{3}$
$_0R^3/l$	$\sqrt{\tfrac{3}{4}} \approx 0.866$	60°	$\tfrac{\pi}{3}$	90°	$\tfrac{\pi}{2}$
$_1R^3/l$	$\sqrt{\tfrac{1}{4}} = 0.5$	45°	$\tfrac{\pi}{4}$	90°	$\tfrac{\pi}{2}$
$_2R^3/l$	$\sqrt{\tfrac{1}{12}} \approx 0.289$	30°	$\tfrac{\pi}{6}$	90°	$\tfrac{\pi}{2}$
$_0R^4/l$	$1$				
$_1R^4/l$	$\sqrt{\tfrac{1}{2}} \approx 0.707$				
$_2R^4/l$	$\sqrt{\tfrac{1}{3}} \approx 0.577$				
$_3R^4/l$	$\sqrt{\tfrac{1}{4}} = 0.5$				

The characteristic 5-cell of the regular 16-cell is represented by the Coxeter-Dynkin diagram, which can be read as a list of the dihedral angles between its mirror facets. It is an irregular tetrahedral pyramid based on the characteristic tetrahedron of the regular tetrahedron. The regular 16-cell is subdivided by its symmetry hyperplanes into 384 instances of its characteristic 5-cell that all meet at its center.

The characteristic 5-cell (4-orthoscheme) has four more edges than its base characteristic tetrahedron (3-orthoscheme), joining the four vertices of the base to its apex (the fifth vertex of the 4-orthoscheme, at the center of the regular 16-cell). (Note: The four edges of each 4-orthoscheme which meet at the center of a regular 4-polytope are of unequal length, because they are the four characteristic radii of the regular 4-polytope: a vertex radius, an edge center radius, a face center radius, and a cell center radius. The five vertices of the 4-orthoscheme always include one regular 4-polytope vertex, one regular 4-polytope edge center, one regular 4-polytope face center, one regular 4-polytope cell center, and the regular 4-polytope center. Those five vertices (in that order) comprise a path along four mutually perpendicular edges (that makes three right angle turns), the characteristic feature of a 4-orthoscheme. The 4-orthoscheme has five dissimilar 3-orthoscheme facets.) If the regular 16-cell has unit radius edge and edge length 𝒍 = $\sqrt{2}$, its characteristic 5-cell's ten edges have lengths $\sqrt{\tfrac{2}{3}}$, $\sqrt{\tfrac{1}{2}}$, $\sqrt{\tfrac{1}{6}}$ around its exterior right-triangle face (the edges opposite the characteristic angles 𝟀, 𝝉, 𝟁), plus $\sqrt{\tfrac{3}{4}}$, $\sqrt{\tfrac{1}{4}}$, $\sqrt{\tfrac{1}{12}}$ (the other three edges of the exterior 3-orthoscheme facet the characteristic tetrahedron, which are the characteristic radii of the regular tetrahedron), plus $1$, $\sqrt{\tfrac{1}{2}}$, $\sqrt{\tfrac{1}{3}}$, $\sqrt{\tfrac{1}{4}}$ (edges which are the characteristic radii of the regular 16-cell). The 4-edge path along orthogonal edges of the orthoscheme is $\sqrt{\tfrac{1}{2}}$, $\sqrt{\tfrac{1}{6}}$, $\sqrt{\tfrac{1}{4}}$, $\sqrt{\tfrac{1}{4}}$, first from a 16-cell vertex to a 16-cell edge center, then turning 90° to a 16-cell face center, then turning 90° to a 16-cell tetrahedral cell center, then turning 90° to the 16-cell center.

==== Helical construction ====
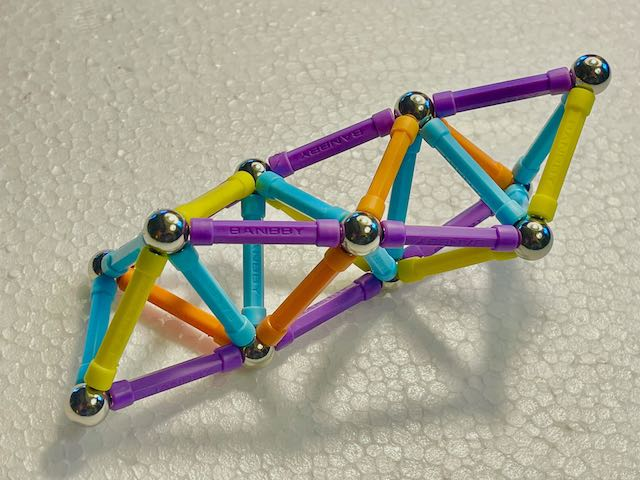
A 4-dimensional ring of 8 face-bonded tetrahedra, seen in the Boerdijk–Coxeter helix, bounded by three eight-edge circular paths of different colors, cut and laid out flat in 3-dimensional space. It contains an isocline axis (not shown), a helical circle of circumference 4𝝅 that twists through all four dimensions and visits all 8 vertices. (Note: In the 16-cell, two antipodal vertices are opposite vertices of two face-bonded tetrahedral cells. The two antipodal vertices are connected by (three different) two-edge great circle paths along edges of the tetrahedral cells, by various three-edge paths, and by four-edge paths on isoclines and Petrie polygons. (Note: An isocline is a circle of special kind corresponding to a pair of Villarceau circles linked in a Möbius loop. It curves through four dimensions instead of just two. All ordinary circles have a 2𝝅 circumference, but the 16-cell's isocline is a circle with an 4𝝅 circumference (over eight 90° chords). An isocline is a circle that does not lie in a plane, but to avoid confusion we always refer to it as an isocline and reserve the term circle for an ordinary circle in the plane.)) The two blue-blue-yellow triangles at either end of the cut ring are the same object.

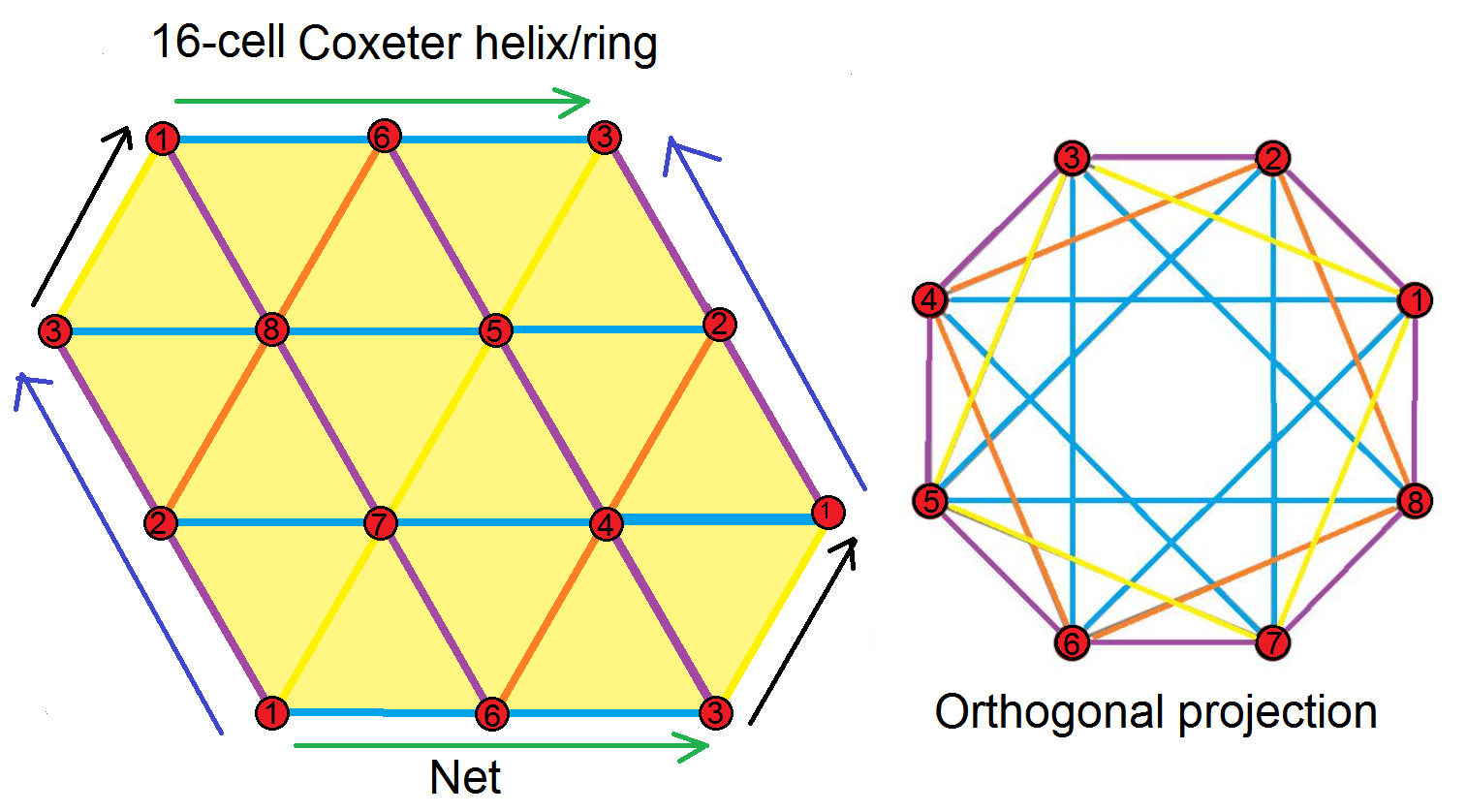
Net and orthogonal projection

A 16-cell can be constructed (three different ways) from two Boerdijk–Coxeter helixes of eight chained tetrahedra, each bent in the fourth dimension into a ring. The two circular helixes spiral around each other, nest into each other and pass through each other forming a Hopf link. The 16 triangle faces can be seen in a 2D net within a triangular tiling, with 6 triangles around every vertex. The purple edges represent the Petrie polygon of the 16-cell. The eight-cell ring of tetrahedra contains three octagrams of different colors, eight-edge circular paths that wind twice around the 16-cell on every third vertex of the octagram. The orange and yellow edges are two four-edge halves of one octagram, which join their ends to form a Möbius strip.

Thus the 16-cell can be decomposed into two cell-disjoint circular chains of eight tetrahedrons each, four edges long, one spiraling to the right (clockwise) and the other spiraling to the left (counterclockwise). The left-handed and right-handed cell rings fit together, nesting into each other and entirely filling the 16-cell, even though they are of opposite chirality. This decomposition can be seen in a 4-4 duoantiprism construction of the 16-cell: or, Schläfli symbol {2}⨂{2} or s{2}s{2}, symmetry [4,2^{+},4], order 64.

Three eight-edge paths (of different colors) spiral along each eight-cell ring, making 90° angles at each vertex. (In the Boerdijk–Coxeter helix before it is bent into a ring, the angles in different paths vary, but are not 90°.) Three paths (with three different colors and apparent angles) pass through each vertex. When the helix is bent into a ring, the segments of each eight-edge path (of various lengths) join their ends, forming a Möbius strip eight edges long along its single-sided circumference of 4𝝅, and one edge wide. The six four-edge halves of the three eight-edge paths each make four 90° angles, but they are not the six orthogonal great squares: they are open-ended squares, four-edge 360° helices whose open ends are antipodal vertices. The four edges come from four different great squares, and are mutually orthogonal. Combined end-to-end in pairs of the same chirality, the six four-edge paths make three eight-edge Möbius loops, helical octagrams. Each octagram is both a Petrie polygon of the 16-cell, and the helical track along which all eight vertices rotate together, in one of the 16-cell's distinct isoclinic rotations. (Note: The 16-cell can be constructed from two cell-disjoint eight-cell rings in three different ways; it has three orientations of its pair of rings. Each orientation "contains" a distinct left-right pair of isoclinic rotations, and also a pair of completely orthogonal great squares (Clifford parallel fibers), so each orientation is a discrete fibration of the 16-cell. Each eight-cell ring contains three axial octagrams which have different orientations (they exchange roles) in the three discrete fibrations and six distinct isoclinic rotations (three left and three right) through the cell rings. Three octagrams (of different colors) can be seen in the illustration of a single cell ring, one in the role of Petrie polygon, one as the right isocline, and one as the left isocline. Because each octagram plays three roles, there are exactly six distinct isoclines in the 16-cell, not 18.)

Five ways of looking at the same skew octagram (Note: All five views are the same orthogonal projection of the 16-cell into the same plane (a circular cross-section of the eight-cell ring cylinder), looking along the central axis of the cut ring cylinder pictured above, from one end of the cylinder. The only difference is which √2 edges and √4 chords are omitted for focus. The different colors of √2 edges appear to be of different lengths because they are oblique to the viewer at different angles. Vertices are numbered 1 (top) through 8 in counterclockwise order.)
Edge path	Petrie polygon	16-cell	Discrete fibration	Diameter chords
Octagram_{{8/3}}	Octagram_{{8/1}}	Coxeter plane B_{4}	Octagram_{{8/2}=2{4}}	Octagram_{{8/4}=4{2}}
The eight √2 chords of the edge-path of an isocline. (Note: Each isocline has the eight continuous √2 chords of its octagram_{{8/3}} edge-path, and also four discontinuous √4 diameter chords that connect every fourth vertex on the octagram but do not connect to each other. Antipodal vertices also have a twisted continuous path of four mutually orthogonal √2 edges connecting them. Between antipodal vertices, the isocline curves smoothly around in a helix over the four √2 chords of its edge-path, hitting the three intervening vertices. Each √2 edge is an edge of a great square, that is completely orthogonal to another great square, in which the √4 chord is a diagonal.)	Skew octagon of eight √2 edges. The 16-cell has 6 of these 8-vertex circuits.	All 24 √2 edges and the four √4 orthogonal axes.	Two completely orthogonal (disjoint) great squares of √2 edges.	The four √4 chords of an isocline. Every fourth isocline vertex is joined to its antipodal vertex by a 16-cell axis.

Each eight-edge helix is a skew octagram {8/3} that winds three times around the 16-cell and visits every vertex before closing into a loop. Its eight √2 edges are chords of an isocline, a helical arc on which the 8 vertices circle during an isoclinic rotation. All eight 16-cell vertices are √2 apart except for opposite (antipodal) vertices, which are √4 apart. A vertex moving on the isocline visits three other vertices that are √2 apart before reaching the fourth vertex that is √4 away.

The eight-cell ring is chiral: there is a right-handed form which spirals clockwise, and a left-handed form which spirals counterclockwise. The 16-cell contains one of each, so it also contains a left and a right isocline; the isocline is the circular axis around which the eight-cell ring twists. Each isocline visits all eight vertices of the 16-cell. (Note: In the 16-cell each single isocline winds through all 8 vertices: an entire fibration of two completely orthogonal great squares. The 5-cell and the 16-cell are the only regular 4-polytopes where each discrete fibration has just one isocline fiber. (Note: Except in the 5-cell and 16-cell, a pair of left and right isocline circles have disjoint vertices: the left and right isocline helices are non-intersecting parallels but counter-rotating, forming a special kind of double helix which cannot occur in three dimensions (where counter-rotating helices of the same radius must intersect).)) Each eight-cell ring contains half of the 16 cells, but all 8 vertices; the two rings share the vertices, as they nest into each other and fit together. They also share the 24 edges, though left and right octagram helices are different eight-edge paths. (Note: The left and right isoclines intersect each other at every vertex. They are different sequences of the same set of 8 vertices. With respect only to the set of 4 vertex pairs which are √2 apart, they can be considered to be Clifford parallel. With respect only to the set of 4 vertex pairs which are √4 apart, they can be considered to be completely orthogonal.)

Because there are three pairs of completely orthogonal great squares, there are three congruent ways to compose a 16-cell from two eight-cell rings. The 16-cell contains three left-right pairs of eight-cell rings in different orientations, with each cell ring containing its axial isocline. Each left-right pair of isoclines is the track of a left-right pair of distinct isoclinic rotations: the rotations in one pair of completely orthogonal invariant planes of rotation. At each vertex, there are three great squares and six octagram isoclines that cross at the vertex and share a 16-cell axis chord.

=== As a configuration ===
This configuration matrix represents the 16-cell. The rows and columns correspond to vertices, edges, faces, and cells. The diagonal numbers say how many of each element occur in the whole 16-cell. The nondiagonal numbers say how many of the column's element occur in or at the row's element.

$$\begin{bmatrix}\begin{matrix}8 & 6 & 12 & 8 \\ 2 & 24 & 4 & 4 \\ 3 & 3 & 32 & 2 \\ 4 & 6 & 4 & 16 \end{matrix}\end{bmatrix}$$

== Tessellations ==
One can tessellate 4-dimensional Euclidean space by regular 16-cells. This is called the 16-cell honeycomb and has Schläfli symbol {3,3,4,3}. Hence, the 16-cell has a dihedral angle of 120°. Each 16-cell has 16 neighbors with which it shares a tetrahedron, 24 neighbors with which it shares only an edge, and 72 neighbors with which it shares only a single point. Twenty-four 16-cells meet at any given vertex in this tessellation.

The dual tessellation, the 24-cell honeycomb, {3,4,3,3}, is made of regular 24-cells. Together with the tesseractic honeycomb {4,3,3,4} these are the only three regular tessellations of R^{4}.

== Projections ==
Orthographic projections
Coxeter plane	B_{4}	B_{3} / D_{4} / A_{2}	B_{2} / D_{3}
Graph			
Dihedral symmetry	[8]	[6]	[4]
Coxeter plane	F_{4}	A_{3}	
Graph			
Dihedral symmetry	[12/3]	[4]	

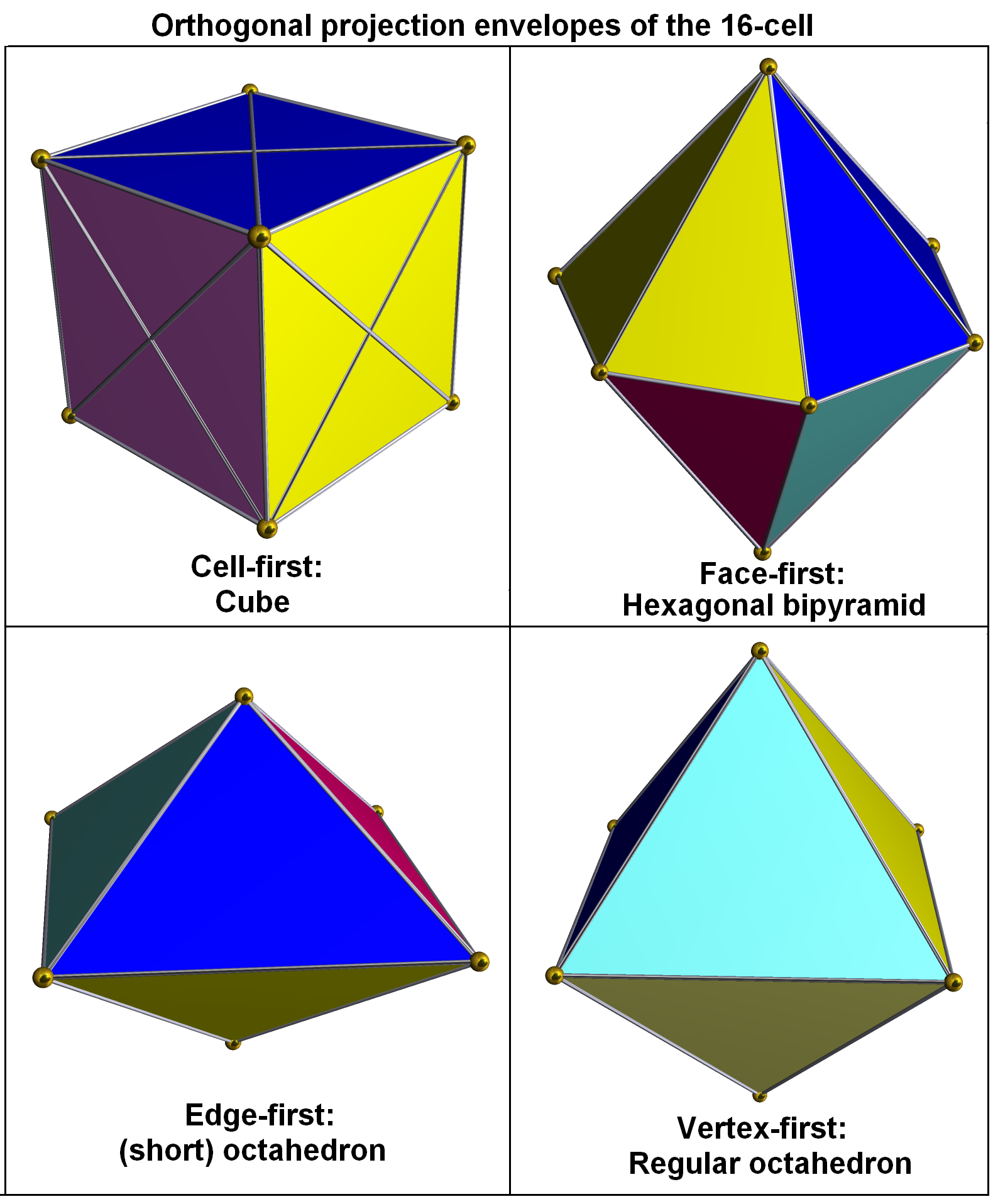
Projection envelopes of the 16-cell. (Each cell is drawn with different color faces, inverted cells are undrawn)

The cell-first parallel projection of the 16-cell into 3-space has a cubical envelope. The closest and farthest cells are projected to inscribed tetrahedra within the cube, corresponding with the two possible ways to inscribe a regular tetrahedron in a cube. Surrounding each of these tetrahedra are 4 other (non-regular) tetrahedral volumes that are the images of the 4 surrounding tetrahedral cells, filling up the space between the inscribed tetrahedron and the cube. The remaining 6 cells are projected onto the square faces of the cube. In this projection of the 16-cell, all its edges lie on the faces of the cubical envelope.

Cell-first parallel projection of sections of 16-cell

The cell-first perspective projection of the 16-cell into 3-space has a triakis tetrahedral envelope. The layout of the cells within this envelope are analogous to that of the cell-first parallel projection.

The vertex-first parallel projection of the 16-cell into 3-space has an octahedral envelope. This octahedron can be divided into 8 tetrahedral volumes, by cutting along the coordinate planes. Each of these volumes is the image of a pair of cells in the 16-cell. The closest vertex of the 16-cell to the viewer projects onto the center of the octahedron.

Finally the edge-first parallel projection has a shortened octahedral envelope, and the face-first parallel projection has a hexagonal bipyramidal envelope.

== 4 sphere Venn diagram ==
A 3-dimensional projection of the 16-cell and 4 intersecting spheres (a Venn diagram of 4 sets) are topologically equivalent.

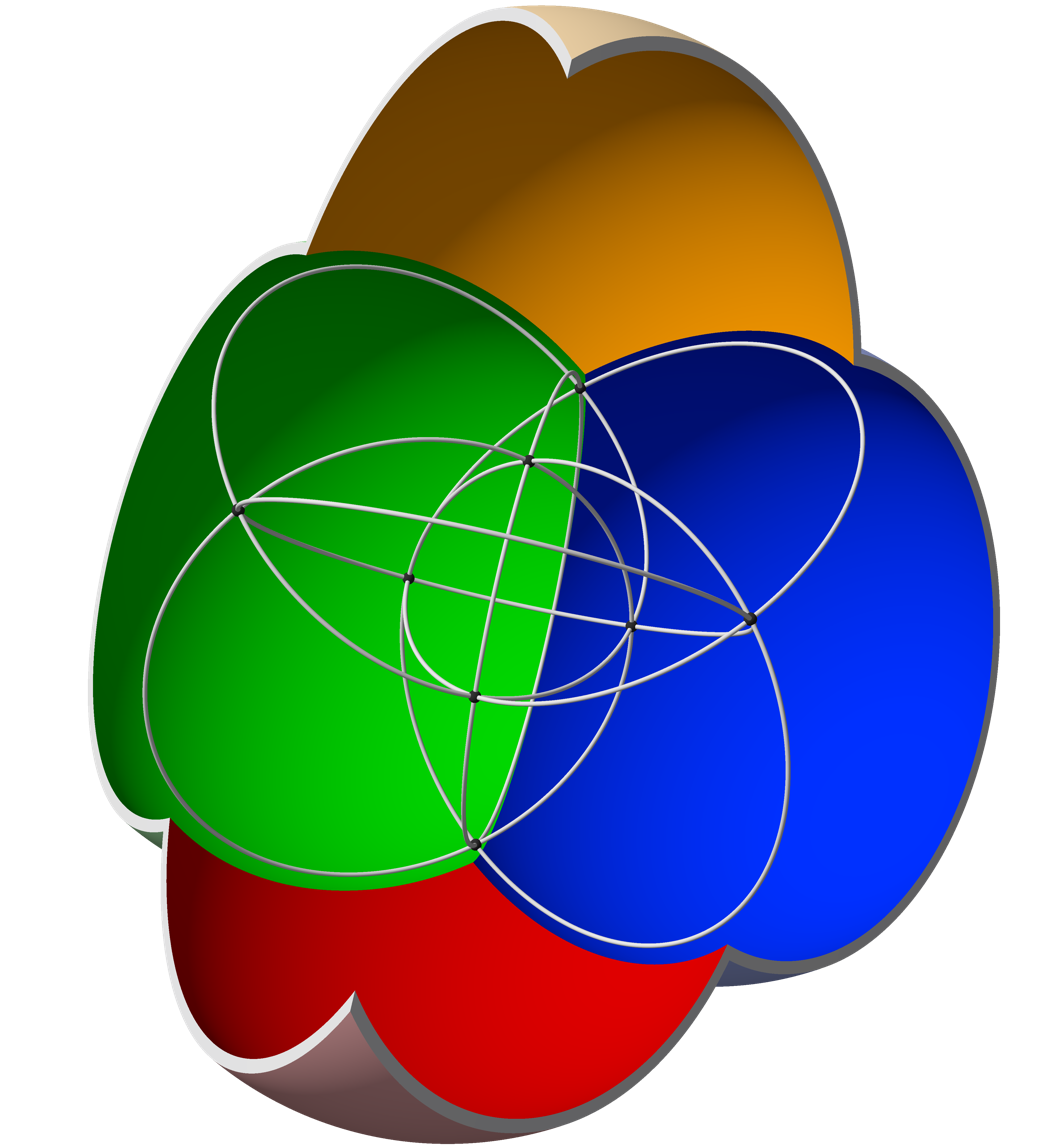
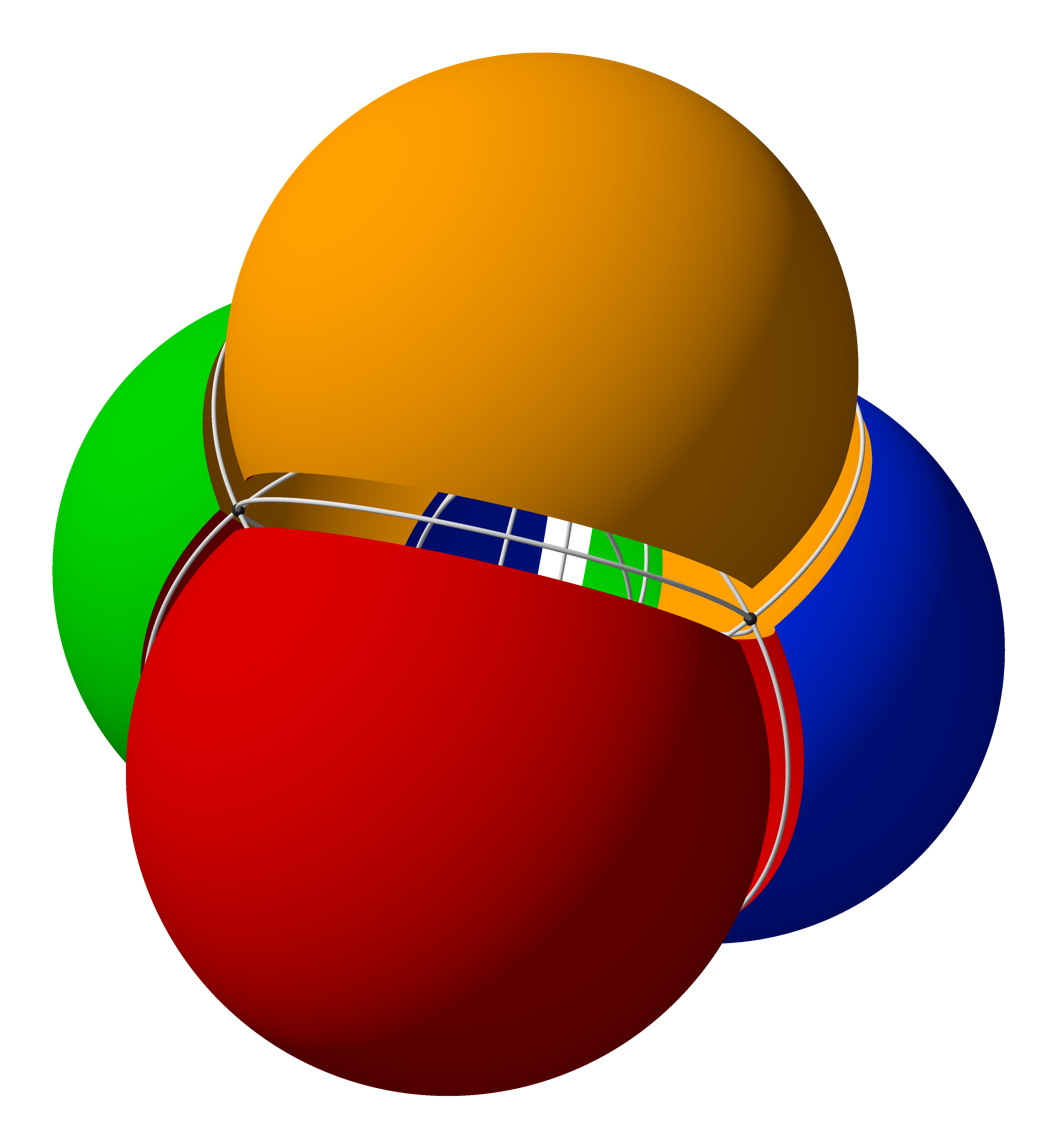
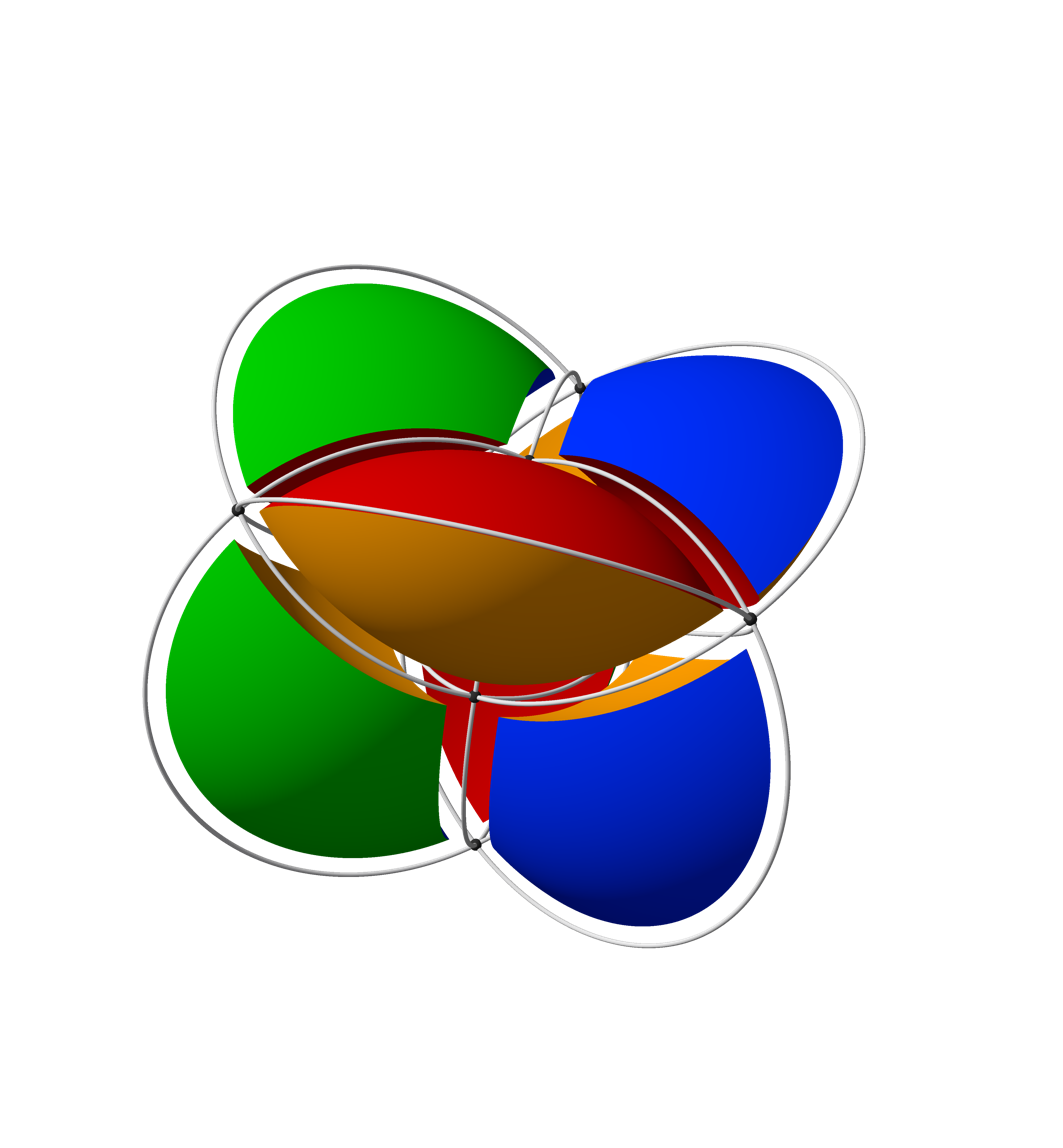
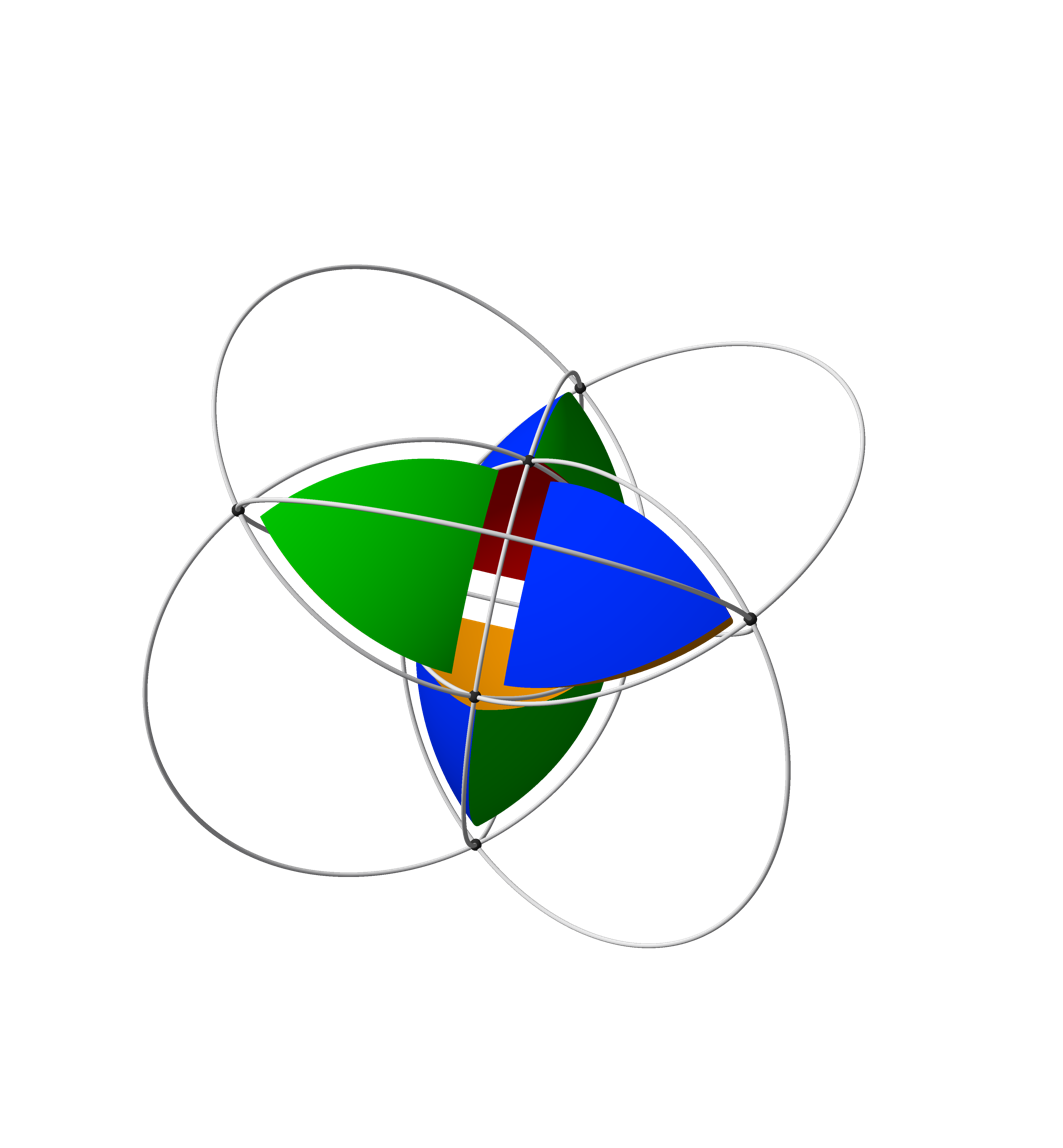
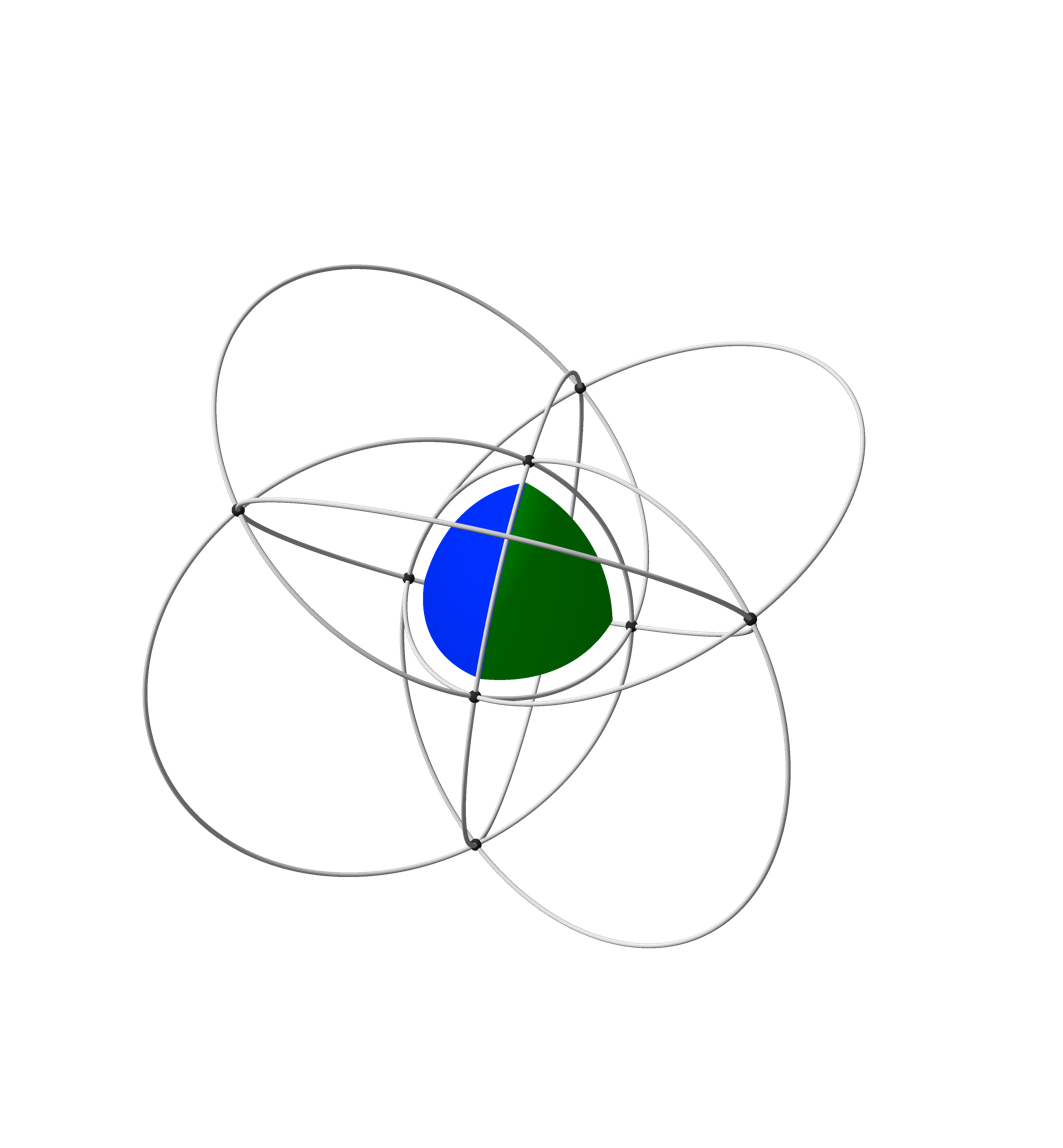
The 16 cells ordered by number of intersecting spheres (from 0 to 4) (see all cells and k-faces)

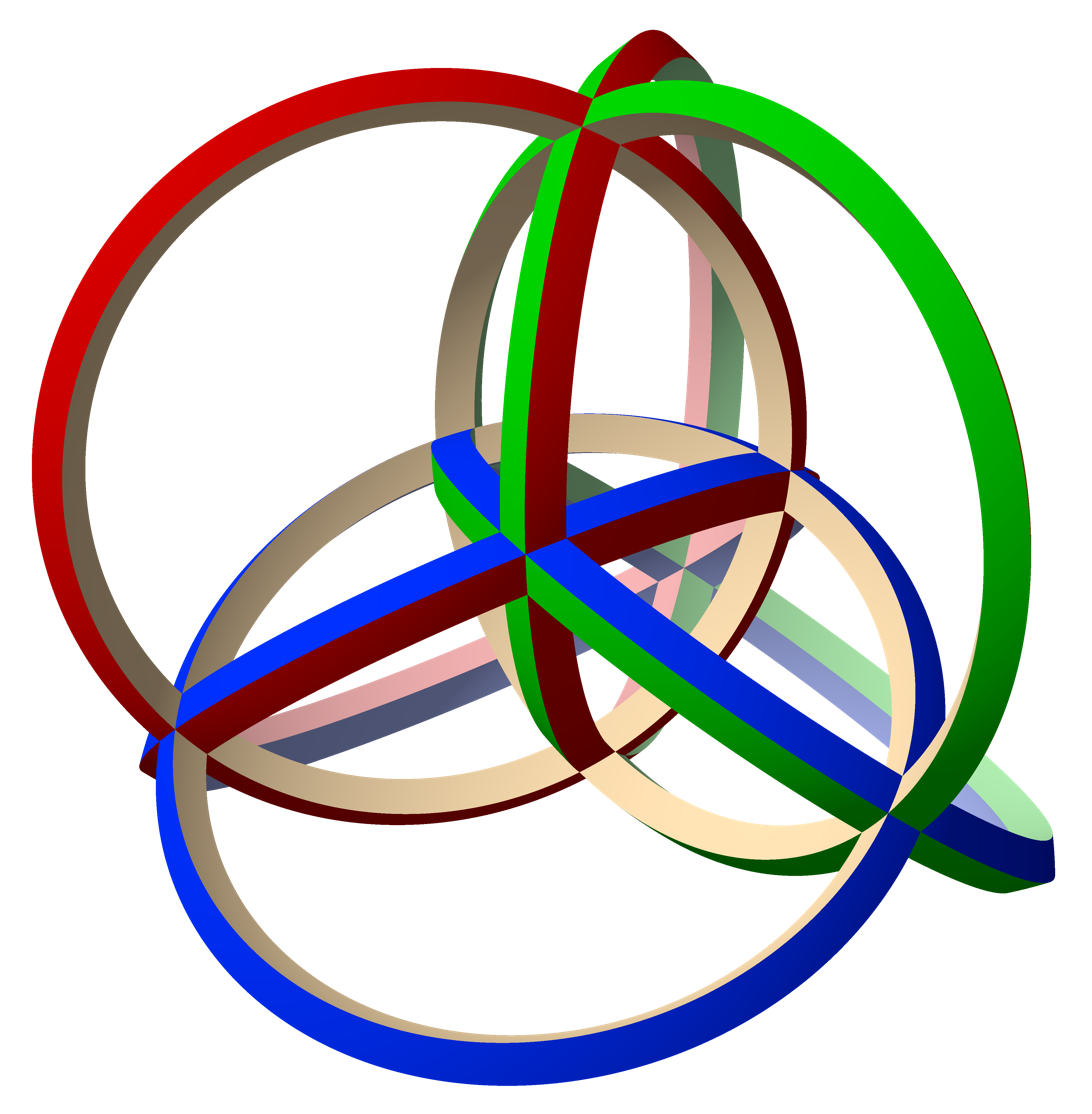
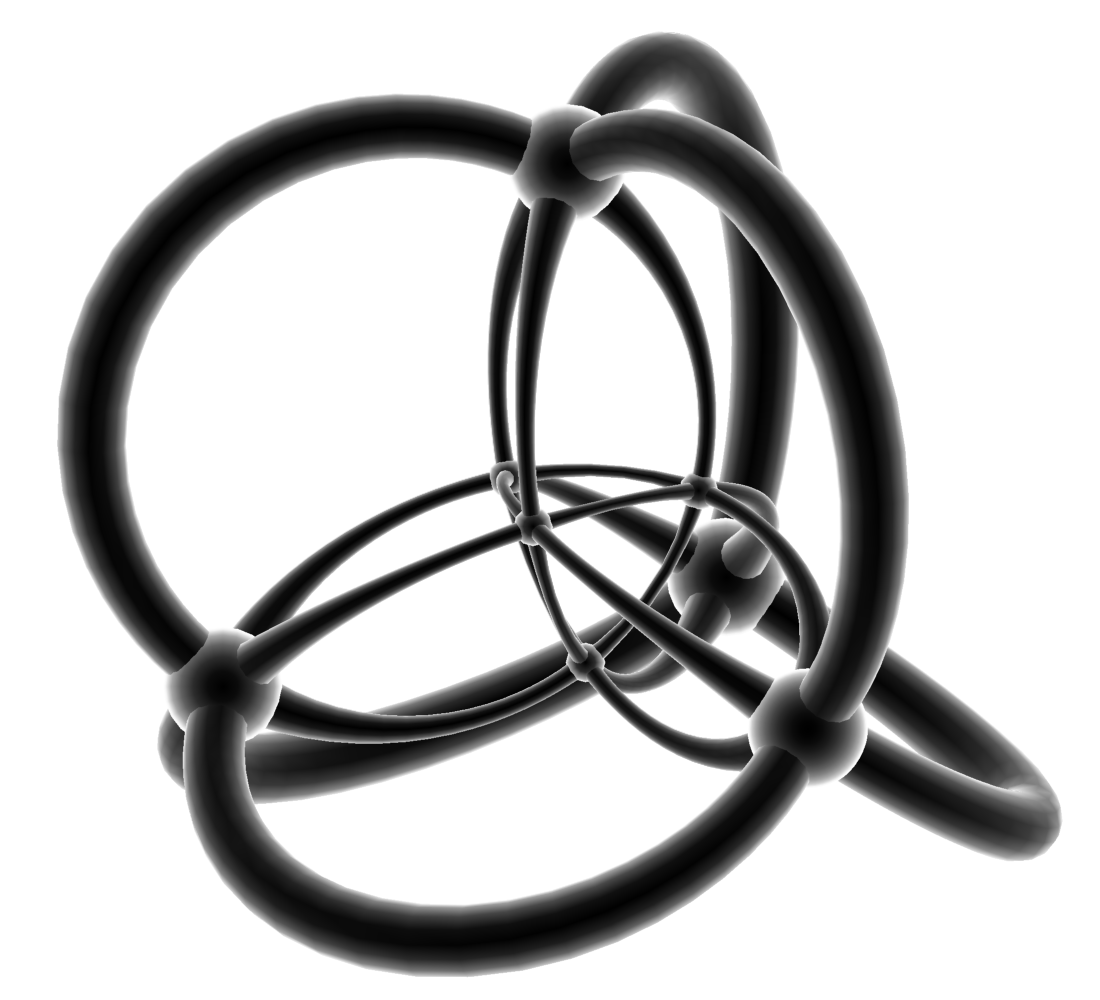
4 sphere Venn diagram and 16-cell projection in the same orientation

== Symmetry constructions ==
The 16-cell's symmetry group is denoted B_{4}.

There is a lower symmetry form of the 16-cell, called a demitesseract or 4-demicube, a member of the demihypercube family, and represented by h{4,3,3}, and Coxeter diagrams or. It can be drawn bicolored with alternating tetrahedral cells.

It can also be seen in lower symmetry form as a tetrahedral antiprism, constructed by 2 parallel tetrahedra in dual configurations, connected by 8 (possibly elongated) tetrahedra. It is represented by s{2,4,3}, and Coxeter diagram:.

It can also be seen as a snub 4-orthotope, represented by s{2^{1,1,1}}, and Coxeter diagram: or.

With the tesseract constructed as a 4-4 duoprism, the 16-cell can be seen as its dual, a 4-4 duopyramid.

Name	Coxeter diagram	Schläfli symbol	Coxeter notation	Order	Vertex figure
Regular 16-cell		{3,3,4}	[3,3,4]	384	
Demitesseract Quasiregular 16-cell	= =	h{4,3,3} {3,3^{1,1}}	[3^{1,1,1}] = [1^{+},4,3,3]	192	
Alternated 4-4 duoprism		2s{4,2,4}	[[4,2^{+},4]]	64	
Tetrahedral antiprism		s{2,4,3}	[2^{+},4,3]	48	
Alternated square prism prism		sr{2,2,4}	[(2,2)^{+},4]	16	
Snub 4-orthotope	=	s{2^{1,1,1}}	[2,2,2]^{+} = [2^{1,1,1}]^{+}	8	
4-fusil
4-fusil		{3,3,4}	[3,3,4]	384	
4-fusil		{4}+{4} or 2{4}	[[4,2,4]] = [8,2^{+},8]	128	
4-fusil		{3,4}+{ }	[4,3,2]	96	
4-fusil		{4}+2{ }	[4,2,2]	32	
4-fusil		{ }+{ }+{ }+{ } or 4{ }	[2,2,2]	16	

== Related complex polygons ==
The Möbius–Kantor polygon is a regular complex polygon _{3}{3}_{3},, in $\mathbb{C}^2$ shares the same vertices as the 16-cell. It has 8 vertices, and 8 3-edges.

The regular complex polygon, _{2}{4}_{4},, in $\mathbb{C}^2$ has a real representation as a 16-cell in 4-dimensional space with 8 vertices, 16 2-edges, only half of the edges of the 16-cell. Its symmetry is _{4}[4]_{2}, order 32.

Orthographic projections of _{2}{4}_{4} polygon
In B_{4} Coxeter plane, _{2}{4}_{4} has 8 vertices and 16 2-edges, shown here with 4 sets of colors.	The 8 vertices are grouped in 2 sets (shown red and blue), each only connected with edges to vertices in the other set, making this polygon a complete bipartite graph, K_{4,4}.

== Related uniform polytopes and honeycombs ==
The regular 16-cell and tesseract are the regular members of a set of 15 uniform 4-polytopes with the same B_{4} symmetry. The 16-cell is also one of the uniform polytopes of D_{4} symmetry.

The 16-cell is also related to the cubic honeycomb, order-4 dodecahedral honeycomb, and order-4 hexagonal tiling honeycomb which all have octahedral vertex figures.

It belongs to the sequence of {3,3,p} 4-polytopes which have tetrahedral cells. The sequence includes three regular 4-polytopes of Euclidean 4-space, the 5-cell {3,3,3}, 16-cell {3,3,4}, and 600-cell {3,3,5}, and the order-6 tetrahedral honeycomb {3,3,6} of hyperbolic space.

It is first in a sequence of quasiregular polytopes and honeycombs h{4,p,q}, and a half symmetry sequence, for regular forms {p,3,4}.

== See also ==
- 24-cell
- 4-polytope
- D4 polytope

Fundamental convex regular and uniform polytopes
Family	A_{n}	B_{n}	I_{2}(p) / D_{n}	E_{6} / E_{7} / E_{8} / F_{4} / G_{2}	H_{n}
Regular polygon	Triangle	Square	p-gon	Hexagon	Pentagon
Uniform polyhedron	Tetrahedron	Octahedron • Cube	Demicube		Dodecahedron • Icosahedron
Uniform polychoron	Pentachoron	16-cell • Tesseract	Demitesseract	24-cell	120-cell • 600-cell
Uniform 5-polytope	5-simplex	5-orthoplex • 5-cube	5-demicube		
Uniform 6-polytope	6-simplex	6-orthoplex • 6-cube	6-demicube	1_{22} • 2_{21}	
Uniform 7-polytope	7-simplex	7-orthoplex • 7-cube	7-demicube	1_{32} • 2_{31} • 3_{21}	
Uniform 8-polytope	8-simplex	8-orthoplex • 8-cube	8-demicube	1_{42} • 2_{41} • 4_{21}	
Uniform n-polytope	n-simplex	n-orthoplex • n-cube	n-demicube	1_{k2} • 2_{k1} • k_{21}	n-pentagonal polytope
Topics: Polytope families • Regular polytope • List of regular polytopes and compounds • Polytope operations

== Citations ==
Fundamental convex regular and uniform polytopes
Family	A_{n}	B_{n}	I_{2}(p) / D_{n}	E_{6} / E_{7} / E_{8} / F_{4} / G_{2}	H_{n}
Regular polygon	Triangle	Square	p-gon	Hexagon	Pentagon
Uniform polyhedron	Tetrahedron	Octahedron • Cube	Demicube		Dodecahedron • Icosahedron
Uniform polychoron	Pentachoron	16-cell • Tesseract	Demitesseract	24-cell	120-cell • 600-cell
Uniform 5-polytope	5-simplex	5-orthoplex • 5-cube	5-demicube		
Uniform 6-polytope	6-simplex	6-orthoplex • 6-cube	6-demicube	1_{22} • 2_{21}	
Uniform 7-polytope	7-simplex	7-orthoplex • 7-cube	7-demicube	1_{32} • 2_{31} • 3_{21}	
Uniform 8-polytope	8-simplex	8-orthoplex • 8-cube	8-demicube	1_{42} • 2_{41} • 4_{21}	
Uniform n-polytope	n-simplex	n-orthoplex • n-cube	n-demicube	1_{k2} • 2_{k1} • k_{21}	n-pentagonal polytope
Topics: Polytope families • Regular polytope • List of regular polytopes and compounds • Polytope operations
