= Uniform 4-polytope =

Class of 4-dimensional polytopes

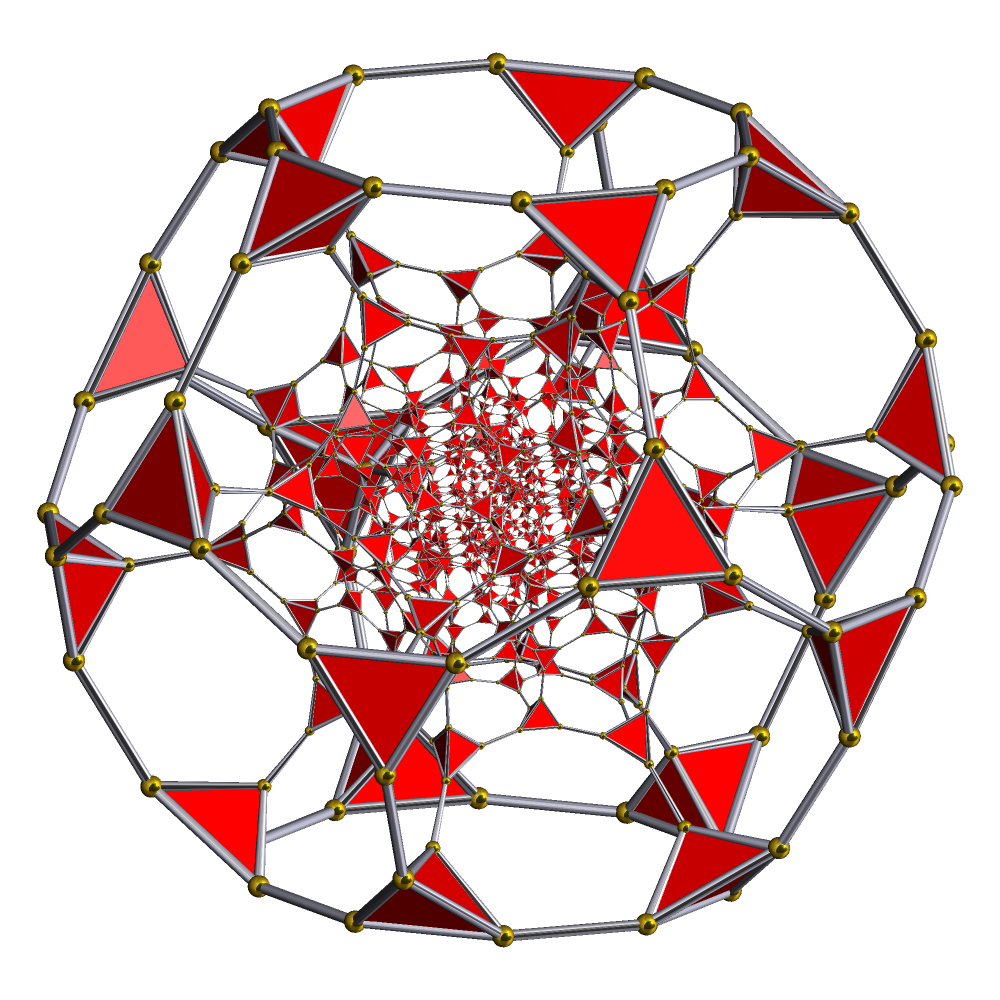
Schlegel diagram for the truncated 120-cell with tetrahedral cells visible

Orthographic projection of the truncated 120-cell, in the H_{3} Coxeter plane (D_{10} symmetry). Only vertices and edges are drawn.

In geometry, a uniform 4-polytope (or uniform polychoron) is a 4-dimensional polytope which is vertex-transitive and whose cells are uniform polyhedra, and faces are regular polygons.

There are 47 non-prismatic convex uniform 4-polytopes. There are two infinite sets of convex prismatic forms, along with 17 cases arising as prisms of the convex uniform polyhedra. There are also an unknown number of non-convex star forms.

== History of discovery ==
- Convex Regular polytopes:
  - 1852: Ludwig Schläfli proved in his manuscript Theorie der vielfachen Kontinuität that there are exactly 6 regular polytopes in 4 dimensions and only 3 in 5 or more dimensions.
- Regular star 4-polytopes (star polyhedron cells and/or vertex figures)
  - 1852: Ludwig Schläfli also found 4 of the 10 regular star 4-polytopes, discounting 6 with cells or vertex figures {^{5}/_{2},5} and {5,^{5}/_{2}}.
  - 1883: Edmund Hess completed the list of 10 of the nonconvex regular 4-polytopes, in his book (in German) Einleitung in die Lehre von der Kugelteilung mit besonderer Berücksichtigung ihrer Anwendung auf die Theorie der Gleichflächigen und der gleicheckigen Polyeder Einleitung in die Lehre von der Kugelteilung mit besonderer Berücksichtigung ihrer Anwendung auf die Theorie der Gleichflächigen und der gleicheckigen Polyeder, von dr. Edmund Hess. Mit sechzehn lithographierten tafeln..
- Convex semiregular polytopes: (Various definitions before Coxeter's uniform category)
  - 1900: Thorold Gosset enumerated the list of nonprismatic semiregular convex polytopes with regular cells (Platonic solids) in his publication On the Regular and Semi-Regular Figures in Space of n Dimensions. In four dimensions, this gives the rectified 5-cell, the rectified 600-cell, and the snub 24-cell.
  - 1910: Alicia Boole Stott, in her publication Geometrical deduction of semiregular from regular polytopes and space fillings, expanded the definition by also allowing Archimedean solid and prism cells. This construction enumerated 45 semiregular 4-polytopes, corresponding to the nonprismatic forms listed below. The snub 24-cell and grand antiprism were missing from her list.
  - 1911: Pieter Hendrik Schoute published Analytic treatment of the polytopes regularly derived from the regular polytopes, followed Boole-Stott's notations, enumerating the convex uniform polytopes by symmetry based on 5-cell, 8-cell/16-cell, and 24-cell.
  - 1912: E. L. Elte independently expanded on Gosset's list with the publication The Semiregular Polytopes of the Hyperspaces, polytopes with one or two types of semiregular facets.
- Convex uniform polytopes:
  - 1940: The search was expanded systematically by H.S.M. Coxeter in his publication Regular and Semi-Regular Polytopes.
  - Convex uniform 4-polytopes:
    - 1965: The complete list of convex forms was finally enumerated by John Horton Conway and Michael Guy, in their publication Four-Dimensional Archimedean Polytopes, established by computer analysis, adding only one non-Wythoffian convex 4-polytope, the grand antiprism.
    - 1966 Norman Johnson completes his Ph.D. dissertation The Theory of Uniform Polytopes and Honeycombs under advisor Coxeter, completes the basic theory of uniform polytopes for dimensions 4 and higher.
    - 1986 Coxeter published a paper Regular and Semi-Regular Polytopes II which included analysis of the unique snub 24-cell structure, and the symmetry of the anomalous grand antiprism.
    - 1998-2000: The 4-polytopes were systematically named by Norman Johnson, and given by George Olshevsky's online indexed enumeration (used as a basis for this listing). Johnson named the 4-polytopes as polychora, like polyhedra for 3-polytopes, from the Greek roots poly ("many") and choros ("room" or "space"). The names of the uniform polychora started with the 6 regular polychora with prefixes based on rings in the Coxeter diagrams; truncation t_{0,1}, cantellation, t_{0,2}, runcination t_{0,3}, with single ringed forms called rectified, and bi, tri-prefixes added when the first ring was on the second or third nodes.
    - 2004: A proof that the Conway-Guy set is complete was published by Marco Möller in his dissertation, Vierdimensionale Archimedische Polytope. Möller reproduced Johnson's naming system in his listing.
    - 2008: The Symmetries of Things was published by John H. Conway and contains the first print-published listing of the convex uniform 4-polytopes and higher dimensional polytopes by Coxeter group family, with general vertex figure diagrams for each ringed Coxeter diagram permutation—snub, grand antiprism, and duoprisms—which he called proprisms for product prisms. He used his own ijk-ambo naming scheme for the indexed ring permutations beyond truncation and bitruncation, and all of Johnson's names were included in the book index.
- Nonregular uniform star 4-polytopes: (similar to the nonconvex uniform polyhedra)
  - 1966: Johnson describes three nonconvex uniform antiprisms in 4-space in his dissertation.
  - 1990-2006: In a collaborative search, up to 2005 a total of 1845 uniform 4-polytopes (convex and nonconvex) had been identified by Jonathan Bowers and George Olshevsky, with an additional four discovered in 2006 for a total of 1849. The count includes the 74 prisms of the 75 non-prismatic uniform polyhedra (since that is a finite set – the cubic prism is excluded as it duplicates the tesseract), but not the infinite categories of duoprisms or prisms of antiprisms.
  - 2020-2023: 342 new polychora were found, bringing up the total number of known uniform 4-polytopes to 2191. The list has not been proven complete.

== Regular 4-polytopes ==
Regular 4-polytopes are a subset of the uniform 4-polytopes, which satisfy additional requirements. Regular 4-polytopes can be expressed with Schläfli symbol {p,q,r} have cells of type {p,q}, faces of type {p}, edge figures {r}, and vertex figures {q,r}.

The existence of a regular 4-polytope {p,q,r} is constrained by the existence of the regular polyhedra {p,q} which becomes cells, and {q,r} which becomes the vertex figure.

Existence as a finite 4-polytope is dependent upon an inequality:

$$\sin \left ( \frac{\pi}{p} \right ) \sin \left(\frac{\pi}{r}\right) > \cos\left(\frac{\pi}{q}\right).$$

The 16 regular 4-polytopes, with the property that all cells, faces, edges, and vertices are congruent:

- 6 regular convex 4-polytopes: 5-cell {3,3,3}, 8-cell {4,3,3}, 16-cell {3,3,4}, 24-cell {3,4,3}, 120-cell {5,3,3}, and 600-cell {3,3,5}.
- 10 regular star 4-polytopes: icosahedral 120-cell {3,5,^{5}/_{2}}, small stellated 120-cell {^{5}/_{2},5,3}, great 120-cell {5,^{5}/_{2},5}, grand 120-cell {5,3,^{5}/_{2}}, great stellated 120-cell {^{5}/_{2},3,5}, grand stellated 120-cell {^{5}/_{2},5,^{5}/_{2}}, great grand 120-cell {5,^{5}/_{2},3}, great icosahedral 120-cell {3,^{5}/_{2},5}, grand 600-cell {3,3,^{5}/_{2}}, and great grand stellated 120-cell {^{5}/_{2},3,3}.

== Convex uniform 4-polytopes ==
=== Symmetry of uniform 4-polytopes in four dimensions ===
Orthogonal subgroups
The 24 mirrors of F_{4} can be decomposed into 2 orthogonal D_{4} groups:
1. = (12 mirrors)
2. = (12 mirrors)
The 10 mirrors of B_{3}×A_{1} can be decomposed into orthogonal groups, 4A_{1} and D_{3}:
1. = (3+1 mirrors)
2. = (6 mirrors)

There are 5 fundamental mirror symmetry point group families in 4-dimensions: A_{4} =, B_{4} =, D_{4} =, F_{4} =, H_{4} =. There are also 3 prismatic groups A_{3}A_{1} =, B_{3}A_{1} =, H_{3}A_{1} =, and duoprismatic groups: I_{2}(p)×I_{2}(q) =. Each group defined by a Goursat tetrahedron fundamental domain bounded by mirror planes.

Each reflective uniform 4-polytope can be constructed in one or more reflective point group in 4 dimensions by a Wythoff construction, represented by rings around permutations of nodes in a Coxeter diagram. Mirror hyperplanes can be grouped, as seen by colored nodes, separated by even-branches. Symmetry groups of the form [a,b,a], have an extended symmetry, [[a,b,a]], doubling the symmetry order. This includes [3,3,3], [3,4,3], and [p,2,p]. Uniform polytopes in these group with symmetric rings contain this extended symmetry.

If all mirrors of a given color are unringed (inactive) in a given uniform polytope, it will have a lower symmetry construction by removing all of the inactive mirrors. If all the nodes of a given color are ringed (active), an alternation operation can generate a new 4-polytope with chiral symmetry, shown as "empty" circled nodes", but the geometry is not generally adjustable to create uniform solutions.

Weyl group	Conway Quaternion	Abstract structure	Order	Coxeter diagram	Coxeter notation	Commutator subgroup	Coxeter number (h)	Mirrors m=2h			
Irreducible
A_{4}	+1/60[I×I].21	S_{5}	120		[3,3,3]	[3,3,3]^{+}	5		10		
D_{4}	±1/3[T×T].2	1/2.^{2}S_{4}	192		[3^{1,1,1}]	[3^{1,1,1}]^{+}	6		12		
B_{4}	±1/6[O×O].2	^{2}S_{4} = S_{2}≀S_{4}	384		[4,3,3]	[3^{1,1,1}]^{+}	8	4	12		
F_{4}	±1/2[O×O].2_{3}	3.^{2}S_{4}	1152		[3,4,3]	[3^{+},4,3^{+}]	12	12	12		
H_{4}	±[I×I].2	2.(A_{5}×A_{5}).2	14400		[5,3,3]	[5,3,3]^{+}	30		60		
Prismatic groups
A_{3}A_{1}	+1/24[O×O].2_{3}	S_{4}×D_{1}	48		[3,3,2] = [3,3]×[ ]	[3,3]^{+}	-		6	1	
B_{3}A_{1}	±1/24[O×O].2	S_{4}×D_{1}	96		[4,3,2] = [4,3]×[ ]	[3,3]^{+}	-	3	6	1	
H_{3}A_{1}	±1/60[I×I].2	A_{5}×D_{1}	240		[5,3,2] = [5,3]×[ ]	[5,3]^{+}	-		15	1	
Duoprismatic groups (Use 2p,2q for even integers)
I_{2}(p)I_{2}(q)	±1/2[D_{2p}×D_{2q}]	D_{p}×D_{q}	4pq		[p,2,q] = [p]×[q]	[p^{+},2,q^{+}]	-		p	q	
I_{2}(2p)I_{2}(q)	±1/2[D_{4p}×D_{2q}]	D_{2p}×D_{q}	8pq		[2p,2,q] = [2p]×[q]	[p^{+},2,q^{+}]	-	p	p	q	
I_{2}(2p)I_{2}(2q)	±1/2[D_{4p}×D_{4q}]	D_{2p}×D_{2q}	16pq		[2p,2,2q] = [2p]×[2q]	[p^{+},2,q^{+}]	-	p	p	q	q

=== Enumeration ===
There are 64 convex uniform 4-polytopes, including the 6 regular convex 4-polytopes, and excluding the infinite sets of the duoprisms and the antiprismatic prisms.

- 5 are polyhedral prisms based on the Platonic solids (1 overlap with regular since a cubic hyperprism is a tesseract)
- 13 are polyhedral prisms based on the Archimedean solids
- 9 are in the self-dual regular A_{4} [3,3,3] group (5-cell) family.
- 9 are in the self-dual regular F_{4} [3,4,3] group (24-cell) family. (Excluding snub 24-cell)
- 15 are in the regular B_{4} [3,3,4] group (tesseract/16-cell) family (3 overlap with 24-cell family)
- 15 are in the regular H_{4} [3,3,5] group (120-cell/600-cell) family.
- 1 special snub form in the [3,4,3] group (24-cell) family.
- 1 special non-Wythoffian 4-polytope, the grand antiprism.
- TOTAL: 68 − 4 = 64

These 64 uniform 4-polytopes are indexed below by George Olshevsky. Repeated symmetry forms are indexed in brackets.

In addition to the 64 above, there are 2 infinite prismatic sets that generate all of the remaining convex forms:

- Set of uniform antiprismatic prisms - sr{p,2}×{ } - Polyhedral prisms of two antiprisms.
- Set of uniform duoprisms - {p}×{q} - A Cartesian product of two polygons.

=== The A_{4} family ===
The 5-cell has diploid pentachoric [3,3,3] symmetry, of order 120, isomorphic to the permutations of five elements, because all pairs of vertices are related in the same way.

Facets (cells) are given, grouped in their Coxeter diagram locations by removing specified nodes.

[3,3,3] uniform polytopes
#	Name Bowers name (and acronym)	Vertex figure	Coxeter diagram and Schläfli symbols	Cell counts by location				Element counts			
#	Name Bowers name (and acronym)	Vertex figure	Coxeter diagram and Schläfli symbols	Pos. 3 (5)	Pos. 2 (10)	Pos. 1 (10)	Pos. 0 (5)	Cells	Faces	Edges	Vertices
1	5-cell Pentachoron (pen)		{3,3,3}	(4) (3.3.3)				5	10	10	5
2	rectified 5-cell Rectified pentachoron (rap)		r{3,3,3}	(3) (3.3.3.3)			(2) (3.3.3)	10	30	30	10
3	truncated 5-cell Truncated pentachoron (tip)		t{3,3,3}	(3) (3.6.6)			(1) (3.3.3)	10	30	40	20
4	cantellated 5-cell Small rhombated pentachoron (srip)		rr{3,3,3}	(2) (3.4.3.4)		(2) (3.4.4)	(1) (3.3.3.3)	20	80	90	30
7	cantitruncated 5-cell Great rhombated pentachoron (grip)		tr{3,3,3}	(2) (4.6.6)		(1) (3.4.4)	(1) (3.6.6)	20	80	120	60
8	runcitruncated 5-cell Prismatorhombated pentachoron (prip)		t_{0,1,3}{3,3,3}	(1) (3.6.6)	(2) (4.4.6)	(1) (3.4.4)	(1) (3.4.3.4)	30	120	150	60

[[3,3,3]] uniform polytopes
#	Name Bowers name (and acronym)	Vertex figure	Coxeter diagram and Schläfli symbols	Cell counts by location			Element counts			
#	Name Bowers name (and acronym)	Vertex figure	Coxeter diagram and Schläfli symbols	Pos. 3-0 (10)	Pos. 1-2 (20)	Alt	Cells	Faces	Edges	Vertices
5	*runcinated 5-cell Small prismatodecachoron (spid)		t_{0,3}{3,3,3}	(2) (3.3.3)	(6) (3.4.4)		30	70	60	20
6	*bitruncated 5-cell Decachoron (deca)		2t{3,3,3}	(4) (3.6.6)			10	40	60	30
9	*omnitruncated 5-cell Great prismatodecachoron (gippid)		t_{0,1,2,3}{3,3,3}	(2) (4.6.6)	(2) (4.4.6)		30	150	240	120
Nonuniform	omnisnub 5-cell Snub decachoron (snad); Snub pentachoron (snip)		ht_{0,1,2,3}{3,3,3}	(2) (3.3.3.3.3)	(2) (3.3.3.3)	(4) (3.3.3)	90	300	270	60

The three uniform 4-polytopes forms marked with an asterisk, *, have the higher extended pentachoric symmetry, of order 240, [[3,3,3]] because the element corresponding to any element of the underlying 5-cell can be exchanged with one of those corresponding to an element of its dual. There is one small index subgroup [3,3,3]^{+}, order 60, or its doubling [[3,3,3]]^{+}, order 120, defining an omnisnub 5-cell which is listed for completeness, but is not uniform.

=== The B_{4} family ===
This family has diploid hexadecachoric symmetry, [4,3,3], of order 24×16=384: 4!=24 permutations of the four axes, 2^{4}=16 for reflection in each axis. There are 3 small index subgroups, with the first two generate uniform 4-polytopes which are also repeated in other families, [1^{+},4,3,3], [4,(3,3)^{+}], and [4,3,3]^{+}, all order 192.

==== Tesseract truncations ====
#	Name (Bowers name and acronym)	Vertex figure	Coxeter diagram and Schläfli symbols	Cell counts by location					Element counts		
#	Name (Bowers name and acronym)	Vertex figure	Coxeter diagram and Schläfli symbols	Pos. 3 (8)	Pos. 2 (24)	Pos. 1 (32)	Pos. 0 (16)	Cells	Faces	Edges	Vertices
10	tesseract or 8-cell Tesseract (tes)		{4,3,3}	(4) (4.4.4)				8	24	32	16
11	Rectified tesseract (rit)		r{4,3,3}	(3) (3.4.3.4)			(2) (3.3.3)	24	88	96	32
13	Truncated tesseract (tat)		t{4,3,3}	(3) (3.8.8)			(1) (3.3.3)	24	88	128	64
14	Cantellated tesseract Small rhombated tesseract (srit)		rr{4,3,3}	(2) (3.4.4.4)		(2) (3.4.4)	(1) (3.3.3.3)	56	248	288	96
15	Runcinated tesseract (also runcinated 16-cell); Small disprismatotesseractihexadecachoron (sidpith)		t_{0,3}{4,3,3}	(1) (4.4.4)	(3) (4.4.4)	(3) (3.4.4)	(1) (3.3.3)	80	208	192	64
16	Bitruncated tesseract (also bitruncated 16-cell); Tesseractihexadecachoron (tah)		2t{4,3,3}	(2) (4.6.6)			(2) (3.6.6)	24	120	192	96
18	Cantitruncated tesseract Great rhombated tesseract (grit)		tr{4,3,3}	(2) (4.6.8)		(1) (3.4.4)	(1) (3.6.6)	56	248	384	192
19	Runcitruncated tesseract Prismatorhombated hexadecachoron (proh)		t_{0,1,3}{4,3,3}	(1) (3.8.8)	(2) (4.4.8)	(1) (3.4.4)	(1) (3.4.3.4)	80	368	480	192
21	Omnitruncated tesseract (also omnitruncated 16-cell); Great disprismatotesseractihexadecachoron (gidpith)		t_{0,1,2,3}{3,3,4}	(1) (4.6.8)	(1) (4.4.8)	(1) (4.4.6)	(1) (4.6.6)	80	464	768	384

Related half tesseract, [1^{+},4,3,3] uniform 4-polytopes
#	Name (Bowers style acronym)	Vertex figure	Coxeter diagram and Schläfli symbols	Cell counts by location					Element counts			
#	Name (Bowers style acronym)	Vertex figure	Coxeter diagram and Schläfli symbols	Pos. 3 (8)	Pos. 2 (24)	Pos. 1 (32)	Pos. 0 (16)	Alt	Cells	Faces	Edges	Vertices
[12]	Half tesseract Demitesseract = 16-cell (hex)		= h{4,3,3}={3,3,4}	(4) (3.3.3)				(4) (3.3.3)	16	32	24	8
[17]	Cantic tesseract = Truncated 16-cell (thex)		= h_{2}{4,3,3}=t{4,3,3}	(4) (6.6.3)			(1) (3.3.3.3)		24	96	120	48
[11]	Runcic tesseract = Rectified tesseract (rit)		= h_{3}{4,3,3}=r{4,3,3}	(3) (3.4.3.4)			(2) (3.3.3)		24	88	96	32
[16]	Runcicantic tesseract = Bitruncated tesseract (tah)		= h_{2,3}{4,3,3}=2t{4,3,3}	(2) (3.4.3.4)			(2) (3.6.6)		24	120	192	96
[11]	= Rectified tesseract (rat)		= h_{1}{4,3,3}=r{4,3,3}						24	88	96	32
[16]	= Bitruncated tesseract (tah)		= h_{1,2}{4,3,3}=2t{4,3,3}						24	120	192	96
[23]	= Rectified 24-cell (rico)		= h_{1,3}{4,3,3}=rr{3,3,4}						48	240	288	96
[24]	= Truncated 24-cell (tico)		= h_{1,2,3}{4,3,3}=tr{3,3,4}						48	240	384	192

#	Name (Bowers style acronym)	Vertex figure	Coxeter diagram and Schläfli symbols	Cell counts by location					Element counts			
#	Name (Bowers style acronym)	Vertex figure	Coxeter diagram and Schläfli symbols	Pos. 3 (8)	Pos. 2 (24)	Pos. 1 (32)	Pos. 0 (16)	Alt	Cells	Faces	Edges	Vertices
Nonuniform	omnisnub tesseract Snub tesseract (snet) (Or omnisnub 16-cell)		ht_{0,1,2,3}{4,3,3}	(1) (3.3.3.3.4)	(1) (3.3.3.4)	(1) (3.3.3.3)	(1) (3.3.3.3.3)	(4) (3.3.3)	272	944	864	192

==== 16-cell truncations ====
#	Name (Bowers name and acronym)	Vertex figure	Coxeter diagram and Schläfli symbols	Cell counts by location					Element counts			
#	Name (Bowers name and acronym)	Vertex figure	Coxeter diagram and Schläfli symbols	Pos. 3 (8)	Pos. 2 (24)	Pos. 1 (32)	Pos. 0 (16)	Alt	Cells	Faces	Edges	Vertices
12	16-cell Hexadecachoron (hex)		{3,3,4}				(8) (3.3.3)		16	32	24	8
[22]	*Rectified 16-cell (Same as 24-cell) (ico)		= r{3,3,4}	(2) (3.3.3.3)			(4) (3.3.3.3)		24	96	96	24
17	Truncated 16-cell Truncated hexadecachoron (thex)		t{3,3,4}	(1) (3.3.3.3)			(4) (3.6.6)		24	96	120	48
[23]	*Cantellated 16-cell (Same as rectified 24-cell) (rico)		= rr{3,3,4}	(1) (3.4.3.4)	(2) (4.4.4)		(2) (3.4.3.4)		48	240	288	96
[15]	Runcinated 16-cell (also runcinated tesseract) (sidpith)		t_{0,3}{3,3,4}	(1) (4.4.4)	(3) (4.4.4)	(3) (3.4.4)	(1) (3.3.3)		80	208	192	64
[16]	Bitruncated 16-cell (also bitruncated tesseract) (tah)		2t{3,3,4}	(2) (4.6.6)			(2) (3.6.6)		24	120	192	96
[24]	*Cantitruncated 16-cell (Same as truncated 24-cell) (tico)		= tr{3,3,4}	(1) (4.6.6)	(1) (4.4.4)		(2) (4.6.6)		48	240	384	192
20	Runcitruncated 16-cell Prismatorhombated tesseract (prit)		t_{0,1,3}{3,3,4}	(1) (3.4.4.4)	(1) (4.4.4)	(2) (4.4.6)	(1) (3.6.6)		80	368	480	192
[21]	Omnitruncated 16-cell (also omnitruncated tesseract) (gidpith)		t_{0,1,2,3}{3,3,4}	(1) (4.6.8)	(1) (4.4.8)	(1) (4.4.6)	(1) (4.6.6)		80	464	768	384
[31]	alternated cantitruncated 16-cell (Same as the snub 24-cell) (sadi)		sr{3,3,4}	(1) (3.3.3.3.3)		(1) (3.3.3)	(2) (3.3.3.3.3)	(4) (3.3.3)	144	480	432	96
Nonuniform	Runcic snub rectified 16-cell Pyritosnub tesseract (pysnet)		sr_{3}{3,3,4}	(1) (3.4.4.4)	(2) (3.4.4)	(1) (4.4.4)	(1) (3.3.3.3.3)	(2) (3.4.4)	176	656	672	192

(*) Just as rectifying the tetrahedron produces the octahedron, rectifying the 16-cell produces the 24-cell, the regular member of the following family.

The snub 24-cell is repeat to this family for completeness. It is an alternation of the cantitruncated 16-cell or truncated 24-cell, with the half symmetry group [(3,3)^{+},4]. The truncated octahedral cells become icosahedra. The cubes becomes tetrahedra, and 96 new tetrahedra are created in the gaps from the removed vertices.

=== The F_{4} family ===
This family has diploid icositetrachoric symmetry, [3,4,3], of order 24×48=1152: the 48 symmetries of the octahedron for each of the 24 cells. There are 3 small index subgroups, with the first two isomorphic pairs generating uniform 4-polytopes which are also repeated in other families, [3^{+},4,3], [3,4,3^{+}], and [3,4,3]^{+}, all order 576.

[3,4,3] uniform 4-polytopes
#	Name	Vertex figure	Coxeter diagram and Schläfli symbols	Cell counts by location				Element counts			
#	Name	Vertex figure	Coxeter diagram and Schläfli symbols	Pos. 3 (24)	Pos. 2 (96)	Pos. 1 (96)	Pos. 0 (24)	Cells	Faces	Edges	Vertices
22	24-cell (Same as rectified 16-cell); Icositetrachoron (ico)		{3,4,3}	(6) (3.3.3.3)				24	96	96	24
23	rectified 24-cell (Same as cantellated 16-cell); Rectified icositetrachoron (rico)		r{3,4,3}	(3) (3.4.3.4)			(2) (4.4.4)	48	240	288	96
24	truncated 24-cell (Same as cantitruncated 16-cell); Truncated icositetrachoron (tico)		t{3,4,3}	(3) (4.6.6)			(1) (4.4.4)	48	240	384	192
25	cantellated 24-cell Small rhombated icositetrachoron (srico)		rr{3,4,3}	(2) (3.4.4.4)		(2) (3.4.4)	(1) (3.4.3.4)	144	720	864	288
28	cantitruncated 24-cell Great rhombated icositetrachoron (grico)		tr{3,4,3}	(2) (4.6.8)		(1) (3.4.4)	(1) (3.8.8)	144	720	1152	576
29	runcitruncated 24-cell Prismatorhombated icositetrachoron (prico)		t_{0,1,3}{3,4,3}	(1) (4.6.6)	(2) (4.4.6)	(1) (3.4.4)	(1) (3.4.4.4)	240	1104	1440	576

[3^{+},4,3] uniform 4-polytopes
#	Name	Vertex figure	Coxeter diagram and Schläfli symbols	Cell counts by location					Element counts			
#	Name	Vertex figure	Coxeter diagram and Schläfli symbols	Pos. 3 (24)	Pos. 2 (96)	Pos. 1 (96)	Pos. 0 (24)	Alt	Cells	Faces	Edges	Vertices
31	†snub 24-cell Snub disicositetrachoron (sadi)		s{3,4,3}	(3) (3.3.3.3.3)			(1) (3.3.3)	(4) (3.3.3)	144	480	432	96
Nonuniform	runcic snub 24-cell Prismatorhombisnub icositetrachoron (prissi)		s_{3}{3,4,3}	(1) (3.3.3.3.3)	(2) (3.4.4)		(1) (3.6.6)	(3) Tricup	240	960	1008	288
[25]	cantic snub 24-cell (Same as cantellated 24-cell) (srico)		s_{2}{3,4,3}	(2) (3.4.4.4)			(1) (3.4.3.4)	(2) (3.4.4)	144	720	864	288
[29]	runcicantic snub 24-cell (Same as runcitruncated 24-cell) (prico)		s_{2,3}{3,4,3}	(1) (4.6.6)		(1) (3.4.4)	(1) (3.4.4.4)	(2) (4.4.6)	240	1104	1440	576

(†) The snub 24-cell here, despite its common name, is not analogous to the snub cube; rather, it is derived by an alternation of the truncated 24-cell. Its symmetry number is only 576, (the ionic diminished icositetrachoric group, [3^{+},4,3]).

Like the 5-cell, the 24-cell is self-dual, and so the following three forms have twice as many symmetries, bringing their total to 2304 (extended icositetrachoric symmetry [[3,4,3]]).

[[3,4,3]] uniform 4-polytopes
#	Name	Vertex figure	Coxeter diagram and Schläfli symbols	Cell counts by location		Element counts			
#	Name	Vertex figure	Coxeter diagram and Schläfli symbols	Pos. 3-0 (48)	Pos. 2-1 (192)	Cells	Faces	Edges	Vertices
26	runcinated 24-cell Small prismatotetracontoctachoron (spic)		t_{0,3}{3,4,3}	(2) (3.3.3.3)	(6) (3.4.4)	240	672	576	144
27	bitruncated 24-cell Tetracontoctachoron (cont)		2t{3,4,3}	(4) (3.8.8)		48	336	576	288
30	omnitruncated 24-cell Great prismatotetracontoctachoron (gippic)		t_{0,1,2,3}{3,4,3}	(2) (4.6.8)	(2) (4.4.6)	240	1392	2304	1152

[[3,4,3]]^{+} isogonal 4-polytope
#	Name	Vertex figure	Coxeter diagram and Schläfli symbols	Cell counts by location			Element counts			
#	Name	Vertex figure	Coxeter diagram and Schläfli symbols	Pos. 3-0 (48)	Pos. 2-1 (192)	Alt	Cells	Faces	Edges	Vertices
Nonuniform	omnisnub 24-cell Snub tetracontoctachoron (snoc); Snub icositetrachoron (sni)		ht_{0,1,2,3}{3,4,3}	(2) (3.3.3.3.4)	(2) (3.3.3.3)	(4) (3.3.3)	816	2832	2592	576

=== The H_{4} family ===
This family has diploid hexacosichoric symmetry, [5,3,3], of order 120×120=24×600=14400: 120 for each of the 120 dodecahedra, or 24 for each of the 600 tetrahedra. There is one small index subgroups [5,3,3]^{+}, all order 7200.

==== 120-cell truncations ====
#	Name (Bowers name and acronym)	Vertex figure	Coxeter diagram and Schläfli symbols	Cell counts by location					Element counts			
#	Name (Bowers name and acronym)	Vertex figure	Coxeter diagram and Schläfli symbols	Pos. 3 (120)	Pos. 2 (720)	Pos. 1 (1200)	Pos. 0 (600)	Alt	Cells	Faces	Edges	Vertices
32	120-cell (hecatonicosachoron or dodecacontachoron); Hecatonicosachoron (hi)		{5,3,3}	(4) (5.5.5)					120	720	1200	600
33	rectified 120-cell Rectified hecatonicosachoron (rahi)		r{5,3,3}	(3) (3.5.3.5)			(2) (3.3.3)		720	3120	3600	1200
36	truncated 120-cell Truncated hecatonicosachoron (thi)		t{5,3,3}	(3) (3.10.10)			(1) (3.3.3)		720	3120	4800	2400
37	cantellated 120-cell Small rhombated hecatonicosachoron (srahi)		rr{5,3,3}	(2) (3.4.5.4)		(2) (3.4.4)	(1) (3.3.3.3)		1920	9120	10800	3600
38	runcinated 120-cell (also runcinated 600-cell); Small disprismatohexacosihecatonicosachoron (sidpixhi)		t_{0,3}{5,3,3}	(1) (5.5.5)	(3) (4.4.5)	(3) (3.4.4)	(1) (3.3.3)		2640	7440	7200	2400
39	bitruncated 120-cell (also bitruncated 600-cell); Hexacosihecatonicosachoron (xhi)		2t{5,3,3}	(2) (5.6.6)			(2) (3.6.6)		720	4320	7200	3600
42	cantitruncated 120-cell Great rhombated hecatonicosachoron (grahi)		tr{5,3,3}	(2) (4.6.10)		(1) (3.4.4)	(1) (3.6.6)		1920	9120	14400	7200
43	runcitruncated 120-cell Prismatorhombated hexacosichoron (prix)		t_{0,1,3}{5,3,3}	(1) (3.10.10)	(2) (4.4.10)	(1) (3.4.4)	(1) (3.4.3.4)		2640	13440	18000	7200
46	omnitruncated 120-cell (also omnitruncated 600-cell); Great disprismatohexacosihecatonicosachoron (gidpixhi)		t_{0,1,2,3}{5,3,3}	(1) (4.6.10)	(1) (4.4.10)	(1) (4.4.6)	(1) (4.6.6)		2640	17040	28800	14400
Nonuniform	omnisnub 120-cell Snub hecatonicosachoron (snixhi) (Same as the omnisnub 600-cell)		ht_{0,1,2,3}{5,3,3}	(1) (3.3.3.3.5)	(1) (3.3.3.5)	(1) (3.3.3.3)	(1) (3.3.3.3.3)	(4) (3.3.3)	9840	35040	32400	7200

==== 600-cell truncations ====
#	Name (Bowers style acronym)	Vertex figure	Coxeter diagram and Schläfli symbols	Symmetry	Cell counts by location				Element counts			
#	Name (Bowers style acronym)	Vertex figure	Coxeter diagram and Schläfli symbols	Symmetry	Pos. 3 (120)	Pos. 2 (720)	Pos. 1 (1200)	Pos. 0 (600)	Cells	Faces	Edges	Vertices
35	600-cell Hexacosichoron (ex)		{3,3,5}	[5,3,3] order 14400				(20) (3.3.3)	600	1200	720	120
[47]	20-diminished 600-cell = Grand antiprism (gap)		Nonwythoffian construction	[[10,2^{+},10]] order 400; Index 36	(2) (3.3.3.5)			(12) (3.3.3)	320	720	500	100
[31]	24-diminished 600-cell = Snub 24-cell (sadi)		Nonwythoffian construction	[3^{+},4,3] order 576 index 25	(3) (3.3.3.3.3)			(5) (3.3.3)	144	480	432	96
Nonuniform	bi-24-diminished 600-cell Bi-icositetradiminished hexacosichoron (bidex)		Nonwythoffian construction	order 144 index 100	(6) tdi				48	192	216	72
34	rectified 600-cell Rectified hexacosichoron (rox)		r{3,3,5}	[5,3,3]	(2) (3.3.3.3.3)			(5) (3.3.3.3)	720	3600	3600	720
Nonuniform	120-diminished rectified 600-cell Swirlprismatodiminished rectified hexacosichoron (spidrox)		Nonwythoffian construction	order 1200 index 12	(2) 3.3.3.5	(2) 4.4.5		(5) P4	840	2640	2400	600
41	truncated 600-cell Truncated hexacosichoron (tex)		t{3,3,5}	[5,3,3]	(1) (3.3.3.3.3)			(5) (3.6.6)	720	3600	4320	1440
40	cantellated 600-cell Small rhombated hexacosichoron (srix)		rr{3,3,5}	[5,3,3]	(1) (3.5.3.5)	(2) (4.4.5)		(1) (3.4.3.4)	1440	8640	10800	3600
[38]	runcinated 600-cell (also runcinated 120-cell) (sidpixhi)		t_{0,3}{3,3,5}	[5,3,3]	(1) (5.5.5)	(3) (4.4.5)	(3) (3.4.4)	(1) (3.3.3)	2640	7440	7200	2400
[39]	bitruncated 600-cell (also bitruncated 120-cell) (xhi)		2t{3,3,5}	[5,3,3]	(2) (5.6.6)			(2) (3.6.6)	720	4320	7200	3600
45	cantitruncated 600-cell Great rhombated hexacosichoron (grix)		tr{3,3,5}	[5,3,3]	(1) (5.6.6)	(1) (4.4.5)		(2) (4.6.6)	1440	8640	14400	7200
44	runcitruncated 600-cell Prismatorhombated hecatonicosachoron (prahi)		t_{0,1,3}{3,3,5}	[5,3,3]	(1) (3.4.5.4)	(1) (4.4.5)	(2) (4.4.6)	(1) (3.6.6)	2640	13440	18000	7200
[46]	omnitruncated 600-cell (also omnitruncated 120-cell) (gidpixhi)		t_{0,1,2,3}{3,3,5}	[5,3,3]	(1) (4.6.10)	(1) (4.4.10)	(1) (4.4.6)	(1) (4.6.6)	2640	17040	28800	14400

=== The D_{4} family ===
This demitesseract family, [3^{1,1,1}], introduces no new uniform 4-polytopes, but it is worthy to repeat these alternative constructions. This family has order 12×16=192: 4!/2=12 permutations of the four axes, half as alternated, 2^{4}=16 for reflection in each axis. There is one small index subgroups that generating uniform 4-polytopes, [3^{1,1,1}]^{+}, order 96.

[3^{1,1,1}] uniform 4-polytopes
#	Name (Bowers style acronym)	Vertex figure	Coxeter diagram = =	Cell counts by location					Element counts			
#	Name (Bowers style acronym)	Vertex figure	Coxeter diagram = =	Pos. 0 (8)	Pos. 2 (24)	Pos. 1 (8)	Pos. 3 (8)	Pos. Alt (96)	3	2	1	0
[12]	demitesseract half tesseract (Same as 16-cell) (hex)		= h{4,3,3}			(4) (3.3.3)	(4) (3.3.3)		16	32	24	8
[17]	cantic tesseract (Same as truncated 16-cell) (thex)		= h_{2}{4,3,3}	(1) (3.3.3.3)		(2) (3.6.6)	(2) (3.6.6)		24	96	120	48
[11]	runcic tesseract (Same as rectified tesseract) (rit)		= h_{3}{4,3,3}	(1) (3.3.3)		(1) (3.3.3)	(3) (3.4.3.4)		24	88	96	32
[16]	runcicantic tesseract (Same as bitruncated tesseract) (tah)		= h_{2,3}{4,3,3}	(1) (3.6.6)		(1) (3.6.6)	(2) (4.6.6)		24	96	96	24

When the 3 bifurcated branch nodes are identically ringed, the symmetry can be increased by 6, as [3[3^{1,1,1}]] = [3,4,3], and thus these polytopes are repeated from the 24-cell family.

[3[3^{1,1,1}]] uniform 4-polytopes
#	Name (Bowers style acronym)	Vertex figure	Coxeter diagram = =	Cell counts by location			Element counts			
#	Name (Bowers style acronym)	Vertex figure	Coxeter diagram = =	Pos. 0,1,3 (24)	Pos. 2 (24)	Pos. Alt (96)	3	2	1	0
[22]	rectified 16-cell (Same as 24-cell) (ico)		= = = {3^{1,1,1}} = r{3,3,4} = {3,4,3}	(6) (3.3.3.3)			48	240	288	96
[23]	cantellated 16-cell (Same as rectified 24-cell) (rico)		= = = r{3^{1,1,1}} = rr{3,3,4} = r{3,4,3}	(3) (3.4.3.4)	(2) (4.4.4)		24	120	192	96
[24]	cantitruncated 16-cell (Same as truncated 24-cell) (tico)		= = = t{3^{1,1,1}} = tr{3,3,4} = t{3,4,3}	(3) (4.6.6)	(1) (4.4.4)		48	240	384	192
[31]	snub 24-cell (sadi)		= = = s{3^{1,1,1}} = sr{3,3,4} = s{3,4,3}	(3) (3.3.3.3.3)	(1) (3.3.3)	(4) (3.3.3)	144	480	432	96

Here again the snub 24-cell, with the symmetry group [3^{1,1,1}]^{+} this time, represents an alternated truncation of the truncated 24-cell creating 96 new tetrahedra at the position of the deleted vertices. In contrast to its appearance within former groups as partly snubbed 4-polytope, only within this symmetry group it has the full analogy to the Kepler snubs, i.e. the snub cube and the snub dodecahedron.

=== The grand antiprism ===
There is one non-Wythoffian uniform convex 4-polytope, known as the grand antiprism, consisting of 20 pentagonal antiprisms forming two perpendicular rings joined by 300 tetrahedra. It is loosely analogous to the three-dimensional antiprisms, which consist of two parallel polygons joined by a band of triangles. Unlike them, however, the grand antiprism is not a member of an infinite family of uniform polytopes.

Its symmetry is the ionic diminished Coxeter group, [[10,2^{+},10]], order 400.

#	Name (Bowers style acronym)	Picture	Vertex figure	Coxeter diagram and Schläfli symbols	Cells by type		Element counts				Net
#	Name (Bowers style acronym)	Picture	Vertex figure	Coxeter diagram and Schläfli symbols	Cells by type		Cells	Faces	Edges	Vertices	Net
47	grand antiprism (gap)			No symbol	300 (3.3.3)	20 (3.3.3.5)	320	20 {5} 700 {3}	500	100	

=== Prismatic uniform 4-polytopes ===
A prismatic polytope is a Cartesian product of two polytopes of lower dimension; familiar examples are the 3-dimensional prisms, which are products of a polygon and a line segment. The prismatic uniform 4-polytopes consist of two infinite families:

- Polyhedral prisms: products of a line segment and a uniform polyhedron. This family is infinite because it includes prisms built on 3-dimensional prisms and antiprisms.
- Duoprisms: products of two polygons.

==== Convex polyhedral prisms ====
The most obvious family of prismatic 4-polytopes is the polyhedral prisms, i.e. products of a polyhedron with a line segment. The cells of such a 4-polytopes are two identical uniform polyhedra lying in parallel hyperplanes (the base cells) and a layer of prisms joining them (the lateral cells). This family includes prisms for the 75 nonprismatic uniform polyhedra (of which 18 are convex; one of these, the cube-prism, is listed above as the tesseract).

There are 18 convex polyhedral prisms created from 5 Platonic solids and 13 Archimedean solids as well as for the infinite families of three-dimensional prisms and antiprisms. The symmetry number of a polyhedral prism is twice that of the base polyhedron.

==== Tetrahedral prisms: A_{3} × A_{1} ====
This prismatic tetrahedral symmetry is [3,3,2], order 48. There are two index 2 subgroups, [(3,3)^{+},2] and [3,3,2]^{+}, but the second doesn't generate a uniform 4-polytope.

[3,3,2] uniform 4-polytopes
#	Name (Bowers style acronym)	Picture	Vertex figure	Coxeter diagram and Schläfli symbols	Cells by type			Element counts				Net
#	Name (Bowers style acronym)	Picture	Vertex figure	Coxeter diagram and Schläfli symbols	Cells by type			Cells	Faces	Edges	Vertices	Net
48	Tetrahedral prism (tepe)			{3,3}×{ } t_{0,3}{3,3,2}	2; 3.3.3	4; 3.4.4		6	8 {3} 6 {4}	16	8	
49	Truncated tetrahedral prism (tuttip)			t{3,3}×{ } t_{0,1,3}{3,3,2}	2; 3.6.6	4; 3.4.4	4; 4.4.6	10	8 {3} 18 {4} 8 {6}	48	24	

[[3,3],2] uniform 4-polytopes
#	Name (Bowers style acronym)	Picture	Vertex figure	Coxeter diagram and Schläfli symbols	Cells by type			Element counts				Net
#	Name (Bowers style acronym)	Picture	Vertex figure	Coxeter diagram and Schläfli symbols	Cells by type			Cells	Faces	Edges	Vertices	Net
[51]	Rectified tetrahedral prism (Same as octahedral prism) (ope)			r{3,3}×{ } t_{1,3}{3,3,2}	2; 3.3.3.3	4; 3.4.4		6	16 {3} 12 {4}	30	12	
[50]	Cantellated tetrahedral prism (Same as cuboctahedral prism) (cope)			rr{3,3}×{ } t_{0,2,3}{3,3,2}	2; 3.4.3.4	8; 3.4.4	6; 4.4.4	16	16 {3} 36 {4}	60	24	
[54]	Cantitruncated tetrahedral prism (Same as truncated octahedral prism) (tope)			tr{3,3}×{ } t_{0,1,2,3}{3,3,2}	2; 4.6.6	8; 6.4.4	6; 4.4.4	16	48 {4} 16 {6}	96	48	
[59]	Snub tetrahedral prism (Same as icosahedral prism) (ipe)			sr{3,3}×{ }	2; 3.3.3.3.3	20; 3.4.4		22	40 {3} 30 {4}	72	24	
Nonuniform	omnisnub tetrahedral antiprism Pyritohedral icosahedral antiprism (pikap)			$s\left\{\begin{array}{l}3\\3\\2\end{array}\right\}$	2; 3.3.3.3.3	8; 3.3.3.3	6+24; 3.3.3	40	16+96 {3}	96	24	

==== Octahedral prisms: B_{3} × A_{1} ====
This prismatic octahedral family symmetry is [4,3,2], order 96. There are 6 subgroups of index 2, order 48 that are expressed in alternated 4-polytopes below. Symmetries are [(4,3)^{+},2], [1^{+},4,3,2], [4,3,2^{+}], [4,3^{+},2], [4,(3,2)^{+}], and [4,3,2]^{+}.

#	Name (Bowers style acronym)	Picture	Vertex figure	Coxeter diagram and Schläfli symbols	Cells by type				Element counts				Net
#	Name (Bowers style acronym)	Picture	Vertex figure	Coxeter diagram and Schläfli symbols	Cells by type				Cells	Faces	Edges	Vertices	Net
[10]	Cubic prism (Same as tesseract) (Same as 4-4 duoprism) (tes)			{4,3}×{ } t_{0,3}{4,3,2}	2; 4.4.4	6; 4.4.4			8	24 {4}	32	16	
50	Cuboctahedral prism (Same as cantellated tetrahedral prism) (cope)			r{4,3}×{ } t_{1,3}{4,3,2}	2; 3.4.3.4	8; 3.4.4	6; 4.4.4		16	16 {3} 36 {4}	60	24	
51	Octahedral prism (Same as rectified tetrahedral prism) (Same as triangular antiprismatic prism) (ope)			{3,4}×{ } t_{2,3}{4,3,2}	2; 3.3.3.3	8; 3.4.4			10	16 {3} 12 {4}	30	12	
52	Rhombicuboctahedral prism (sircope)			rr{4,3}×{ } t_{0,2,3}{4,3,2}	2; 3.4.4.4	8; 3.4.4	18; 4.4.4		28	16 {3} 84 {4}	120	48	
53	Truncated cubic prism (ticcup)			t{4,3}×{ } t_{0,1,3}{4,3,2}	2; 3.8.8	8; 3.4.4	6; 4.4.8		16	16 {3} 36 {4} 12 {8}	96	48	
54	Truncated octahedral prism (Same as cantitruncated tetrahedral prism) (tope)			t{3,4}×{ } t_{1,2,3}{4,3,2}	2; 4.6.6	6; 4.4.4	8; 4.4.6		16	48 {4} 16 {6}	96	48	
55	Truncated cuboctahedral prism (gircope)			tr{4,3}×{ } t_{0,1,2,3}{4,3,2}	2; 4.6.8	12; 4.4.4	8; 4.4.6	6; 4.4.8	28	96 {4} 16 {6} 12 {8}	192	96	
56	Snub cubic prism (sniccup)			sr{4,3}×{ }	2; 3.3.3.3.4	32; 3.4.4	6; 4.4.4		40	64 {3} 72 {4}	144	48	
[48]	Tetrahedral prism (tepe)			h{4,3}×{ }	2; 3.3.3	4; 3.4.4			6	8 {3} 6 {4}	16	8	
[49]	Truncated tetrahedral prism (tuttip)			h_{2}{4,3}×{ }	2; 3.3.6	4; 3.4.4	4; 4.4.6		6	8 {3} 6 {4}	16	8	
[50]	Cuboctahedral prism (cope)			rr{3,3}×{ }	2; 3.4.3.4	8; 3.4.4	6; 4.4.4		16	16 {3} 36 {4}	60	24	
[52]	Rhombicuboctahedral prism (sircope)			s_{2}{3,4}×{ }	2; 3.4.4.4	8; 3.4.4	18; 4.4.4		28	16 {3} 84 {4}	120	48	
[54]	Truncated octahedral prism (tope)			tr{3,3}×{ }	2; 4.6.6	6; 4.4.4	8; 4.4.6		16	48 {4} 16 {6}	96	48	
[59]	Icosahedral prism (ipe)			s{3,4}×{ }	2; 3.3.3.3.3	20; 3.4.4			22	40 {3} 30 {4}	72	24	
[12]	16-cell (hex)			s{2,4,3}	2+6+8; 3.3.3.3				16	32 {3}	24	8	
Nonuniform	Omnisnub tetrahedral antiprism = Pyritohedral icosahedral antiprism (pikap)			sr{2,3,4}	2; 3.3.3.3.3	8; 3.3.3.3	6+24; 3.3.3		40	16+96 {3}	96	24	
Nonuniform	Edge-snub octahedral hosochoron Pyritosnub alterprism (pysna)			sr_{3}{2,3,4}	2; 3.4.4.4	6; 4.4.4	8; 3.3.3.3	24; 3.4.4	40	16+48 {3} 12+12+24+24 {4}	144	48	
Nonuniform	Omnisnub cubic antiprism Snub cubic antiprism (sniccap)			$s\left\{\begin{array}{l}4\\3\\2\end{array}\right\}$	2; 3.3.3.3.4	12+48; 3.3.3	8; 3.3.3.3	6; 3.3.3.4	76	16+192 {3} 12 {4}	192	48	
Nonuniform	Runcic snub cubic hosochoron Truncated tetrahedral alterprism (tuta)			s_{3}{2,4,3}	2; 3.6.6	6; 3.3.3	8 triangular cupola		16	52	60	24	

==== Icosahedral prisms: H_{3} × A_{1} ====
This prismatic icosahedral symmetry is [5,3,2], order 240. There are two index 2 subgroups, [(5,3)^{+},2] and [5,3,2]^{+}, but the second doesn't generate a uniform polychoron.

#	Name (Bowers name and acronym)	Picture	Vertex figure	Coxeter diagram and Schläfli symbols	Cells by type				Element counts				Net
#	Name (Bowers name and acronym)	Picture	Vertex figure	Coxeter diagram and Schläfli symbols	Cells by type				Cells	Faces	Edges	Vertices	Net
57	Dodecahedral prism (dope)			{5,3}×{ } t_{0,3}{5,3,2}	2; 5.5.5	12; 4.4.5			14	30 {4} 24 {5}	80	40	
58	Icosidodecahedral prism (iddip)			r{5,3}×{ } t_{1,3}{5,3,2}	2; 3.5.3.5	20; 3.4.4	12; 4.4.5		34	40 {3} 60 {4} 24 {5}	150	60	
59	Icosahedral prism (same as snub tetrahedral prism) (ipe)			{3,5}×{ } t_{2,3}{5,3,2}	2; 3.3.3.3.3	20; 3.4.4			22	40 {3} 30 {4}	72	24	
60	Truncated dodecahedral prism (tiddip)			t{5,3}×{ } t_{0,1,3}{5,3,2}	2; 3.10.10	20; 3.4.4	12; 4.4.10		34	40 {3} 90 {4} 24 {10}	240	120	
61	Rhombicosidodecahedral prism (sriddip)			rr{5,3}×{ } t_{0,2,3}{5,3,2}	2; 3.4.5.4	20; 3.4.4	30; 4.4.4	12; 4.4.5	64	40 {3} 180 {4} 24 {5}	300	120	
62	Truncated icosahedral prism (tipe)			t{3,5}×{ } t_{1,2,3}{5,3,2}	2; 5.6.6	12; 4.4.5	20; 4.4.6		34	90 {4} 24 {5} 40 {6}	240	120	
63	Truncated icosidodecahedral prism (griddip)			tr{5,3}×{ } t_{0,1,2,3}{5,3,2}	2; 4.6.10	30; 4.4.4	20; 4.4.6	12; 4.4.10	64	240 {4} 40 {6} 24 {10}	480	240	
64	Snub dodecahedral prism (sniddip)			sr{5,3}×{ }	2; 3.3.3.3.5	80; 3.4.4	12; 4.4.5		94	160 {3} 150 {4} 24 {5}	360	120	
Nonuniform	Omnisnub dodecahedral antiprism Snub dodecahedral antiprism (sniddap)			$s\left\{\begin{array}{l}5\\3\\2\end{array}\right\}$	2; 3.3.3.3.5	30+120; 3.3.3	20; 3.3.3.3	12; 3.3.3.5	184	20+240 {3} 24 {5}	220	120	

==== Duoprisms: [p] × [q] ====
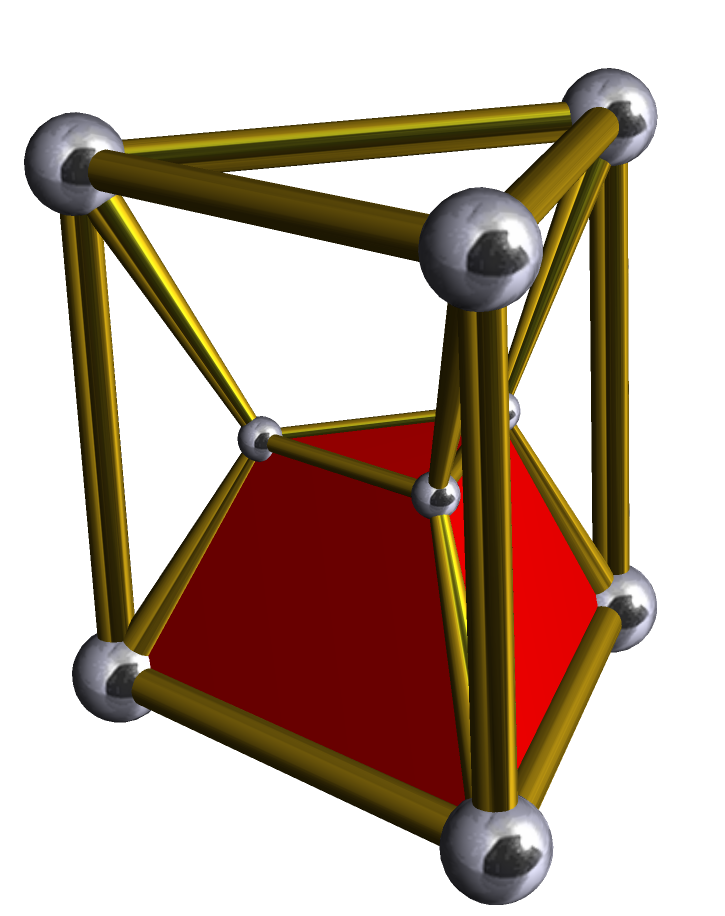
The simplest of the duoprisms, the 3,3-duoprism, in Schlegel diagram, one of 6 triangular prism cells shown.

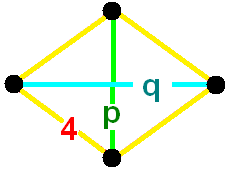
The second is the infinite family of uniform duoprisms, products of two regular polygons. A duoprism's Coxeter-Dynkin diagram is. Its vertex figure is a disphenoid tetrahedron, .

This family overlaps with the first: when one of the two "factor" polygons is a square, the product is equivalent to a hyperprism whose base is a three-dimensional prism. The symmetry number of a duoprism whose factors are a p-gon and a q-gon (a "p,q-duoprism") is 4pq if p≠q; if the factors are both p-gons, the symmetry number is 8p^{2}. The tesseract can also be considered a 4,4-duoprism.

The extended f-vector of {p}×{q} is (p,p,1)*(q,q,1) = (pq,2pq,pq+p+q,p+q).

- Cells: p q-gonal prisms, q p-gonal prisms
- Faces: pq squares, p q-gons, q p-gons
- Edges: 2pq
- Vertices: pq

There is no uniform analogue in four dimensions to the infinite family of three-dimensional antiprisms.

Infinite set of p-q duoprism - - p q-gonal prisms, q p-gonal prisms:

Name	Coxeter graph	Cells	Images	Net
3-3 duoprism (triddip)		3+3 triangular prisms		
3-4 duoprism (tisdip)		3 cubes 4 triangular prisms		
4-4 duoprism (tes) (same as tesseract)		4+4 cubes		
3-5 duoprism (trapedip)		3 pentagonal prisms 5 triangular prisms		
4-5 duoprism (squipdip)		4 pentagonal prisms 5 cubes		
5-5 duoprism (pedip)		5+5 pentagonal prisms		
3-6 duoprism (thiddip)		3 hexagonal prisms 6 triangular prisms		
4-6 duoprism (shiddip)		4 hexagonal prisms 6 cubes		
5-6 duoprism (phiddip)		5 hexagonal prisms 6 pentagonal prisms		
6-6 duoprism (hiddip)		6+6 hexagonal prisms		

3-3	3-4	3-5	3-6	3-7	3-8
4-3	4-4	4-5	4-6	4-7	4-8
5-3	5-4	5-5	5-6	5-7	5-8
6-3	6-4	6-5	6-6	6-7	6-8
7-3	7-4	7-5	7-6	7-7	7-8
8-3	8-4	8-5	8-6	8-7	8-8

Alternations are possible. = gives the family of duoantiprisms, but they generally cannot be made uniform. p=q=2 is the only convex case that can be made uniform, giving the regular 16-cell. p=5, q=5/3 is the only nonconvex case that can be made uniform, giving the so-called great duoantiprism. gives the p-2q-gonal prismantiprismoid (an edge-alternation of the 2p-4q duoprism), but this cannot be made uniform in any cases.

==== Polygonal prismatic prisms: [p] × [ ] × [ ] ====
The infinite set of uniform prismatic prisms overlaps with the 4-p duoprisms: (p≥3) - - p cubes and 4 p-gonal prisms - (All are the same as 4-p duoprism) The second polytope in the series is a lower symmetry of the regular tesseract, {4}×{4}.

Convex p-gonal prismatic prisms
Name	{3}×{4}	{4}×{4}	{5}×{4}	{6}×{4}	{7}×{4}	{8}×{4}	{p}×{4}
Coxeter diagrams							
Image							
Cells	3 {4}×{} 4 {3}×{}	4 {4}×{} 4 {4}×{}	5 {4}×{} 4 {5}×{}	6 {4}×{} 4 {6}×{}	7 {4}×{} 4 {7}×{}	8 {4}×{} 4 {8}×{}	p {4}×{} 4 {p}×{}
Net							

==== Polygonal antiprismatic prisms: [p] × [ ] × [ ] ====
The infinite sets of uniform antiprismatic prisms are constructed from two parallel uniform antiprisms): (p≥2) - - 2 p-gonal antiprisms, connected by 2 p-gonal prisms and 2p triangular prisms.

Convex p-gonal antiprismatic prisms
Name	s{2,2}×{}	s{2,3}×{}	s{2,4}×{}	s{2,5}×{}	s{2,6}×{}	s{2,7}×{}	s{2,8}×{}	s{2,p}×{}
Coxeter diagram								
Image								
Vertex figure								
Cells	2 s{2,2} (2) {2}×{}={4} 4 {3}×{}	2 s{2,3} 2 {3}×{} 6 {3}×{}	2 s{2,4} 2 {4}×{} 8 {3}×{}	2 s{2,5} 2 {5}×{} 10 {3}×{}	2 s{2,6} 2 {6}×{} 12 {3}×{}	2 s{2,7} 2 {7}×{} 14 {3}×{}	2 s{2,8} 2 {8}×{} 16 {3}×{}	2 s{2,p} 2 {p}×{} 2p {3}×{}
Net								

A p-gonal antiprismatic prism has 4p triangle, 4p square and 4 p-gon faces. It has 10p edges, and 4p vertices.

=== Nonuniform alternations ===
Like the 3-dimensional snub cube,, an alternation removes half the vertices, in two chiral sets of vertices from the ringed form, however the uniform solution requires the vertex positions be adjusted for equal lengths. In four dimensions, this adjustment is only possible for 2 alternated figures, while the rest only exist as nonequilateral alternated figures.

Coxeter showed only two uniform solutions for rank 4 Coxeter groups with all rings alternated (shown with empty circle nodes). The first is, s{2^{1,1,1}} which represented an index 24 subgroup (symmetry [2,2,2]^{+}, order 8) form of the demitesseract,, h{4,3,3} (symmetry [1^{+},4,3,3] = [3^{1,1,1}], order 192). The second is, s{3^{1,1,1}}, which is an index 6 subgroup (symmetry [3^{1,1,1}]^{+}, order 96) form of the snub 24-cell,, s{3,4,3}, (symmetry [3^{+},4,3], order 576).

Other alternations, such as, as an alternation from the omnitruncated tesseract, can not be made uniform as solving for equal edge lengths are in general overdetermined (there are six equations but only four variables). Such nonuniform alternated figures can be constructed as vertex-transitive 4-polytopes by the removal of one of two half sets of the vertices of the full ringed figure, but will have unequal edge lengths. Just like uniform alternations, they will have half of the symmetry of uniform figure, like [4,3,3]^{+}, order 192, is the symmetry of the alternated omnitruncated tesseract.

Wythoff constructions with alternations produce vertex-transitive figures that can be made equilateral, but not uniform because the alternated gaps (around the removed vertices) create cells that are not regular or semiregular. A proposed name for such figures is scaliform polytopes. This category allows a subset of Johnson solids as cells, for example the triangular cupola.

Each vertex configuration within a Johnson solid must exist within the vertex figure. For example, a square pyramid has two vertex configurations: 3.3.4 around the base, and 3.3.3.3 at the apex.

The nets and vertex figures of the four convex equilateral cases are given below, along with a list of cells around each vertex.

Four convex vertex-transitive equilateral 4-polytopes with nonuniform cells
Coxeter diagram	s_{3}{2,4,3},	s_{3}{3,4,3},	Others	
Relation	24 of 48 vertices of rhombicuboctahedral prism	288 of 576 vertices of runcitruncated 24-cell	72 of 120 vertices of 600-cell	600 of 720 vertices of rectified 600-cell
Projection				Two rings of pyramids
Net	runcic snub cubic hosochoron	runcic snub 24-cell		
Cells				
Vertex figure	(1) 3.4.3.4: triangular cupola (2) 3.4.6: triangular cupola (1) 3.3.3: tetrahedron (1) 3.6.6: truncated tetrahedron	(1) 3.4.3.4: triangular cupola (2) 3.4.6: triangular cupola (2) 3.4.4: triangular prism (1) 3.6.6: truncated tetrahedron (1) 3.3.3.3.3: icosahedron	(2) 3.3.3.5: tridiminished icosahedron (4) 3.5.5: tridiminished icosahedron	(1) 3.3.3.3: square pyramid (4) 3.3.4: square pyramid (2) 4.4.5: pentagonal prism (2) 3.3.3.5 pentagonal antiprism

=== Geometric derivations for 46 nonprismatic Wythoffian uniform polychora ===
The 46 Wythoffian 4-polytopes include the six convex regular 4-polytopes. The other forty can be derived from the regular polychora by geometric operations which preserve most or all of their symmetries, and therefore may be classified by the symmetry groups that they have in common.

Summary chart of truncation operations	Example locations of kaleidoscopic generator point on fundamental domain.

The geometric operations that derive the 40 uniform 4-polytopes from the regular 4-polytopes are truncating operations. A 4-polytope may be truncated at the vertices, edges or faces, leading to addition of cells corresponding to those elements, as shown in the columns of the tables below.

The Coxeter-Dynkin diagram shows the four mirrors of the Wythoffian kaleidoscope as nodes, and the edges between the nodes are labeled by an integer showing the angle between the mirrors (π/n radians or 180/n degrees). Circled nodes show which mirrors are active for each form; a mirror is active with respect to a vertex that does not lie on it.

Row	Operation	Schläfli symbol	Symmetry	Coxeter diagram	Description
1	Parent	t_{0}{p,q,r}	[p,q,r]		Original regular form {p,q,r}
2	Rectification	t_{1}{p,q,r}	[p,q,r]		Truncation operation applied until the original edges are degenerated into points.
3	Birectification (Rectified dual)	t_{2}{p,q,r}	[p,q,r]		Face are fully truncated to points. Same as rectified dual.
4	Trirectification (dual)	t_{3}{p,q,r}	[p,q,r]		Cells are truncated to points. Regular dual {r,q,p}
5	Truncation	t_{0,1}{p,q,r}	[p,q,r]		Each vertex is cut off so that the middle of each original edge remains. Where the vertex was, there appears a new cell, the parent's vertex figure. Each original cell is likewise truncated.
6	Cantellation	t_{0,2}{p,q,r}	[p,q,r]		A truncation applied to edges and vertices and defines a progression between the regular and dual rectified form.
7	Runcination (or expansion)	t_{0,3}{p,q,r}	[p,q,r]		A truncation applied to the cells, faces and edges; defines a progression between a regular form and the dual.
8	Bitruncation	t_{1,2}{p,q,r}	[p,q,r]		A truncation between a rectified form and the dual rectified form.
9	Bicantellation	t_{1,3}{p,q,r}	[p,q,r]		Cantellated dual {r,q,p}.
10	Tritruncation	t_{2,3}{p,q,r}	[p,q,r]		Truncated dual {r,q,p}.
11	Cantitruncation	t_{0,1,2}{p,q,r}	[p,q,r]		Both the cantellation and truncation operations applied together.
12	Runcitruncation	t_{0,1,3}{p,q,r}	[p,q,r]		Both the runcination and truncation operations applied together.
13	Runcicantellation	t_{0,2,3}{p,q,r}	[p,q,r]		Runcitruncated dual {r,q,p}.
14	Bicantitruncation	t_{1,2,3}{p,q,r}	[p,q,r]		Cantitruncated dual {r,q,p}.
15	Omnitruncation (runcicantitruncation)	t_{0,1,2,3}{p,q,r}	[p,q,r]		Application of all three operators.
16	Snub	s{p,2q,r}	[p^{+},2q,r]		Alternated truncation
17	Cantic snub	s_{2}{p,2q,r}	[p^{+},2q,r]		Cantellated alternated truncation
18	Runcic snub	s_{3}{p,2q,r}	[p^{+},2q,r]		Runcinated alternated truncation
19	Runcicantic snub	s_{2,3}{p,2q,r}	[p^{+},2q,r]		Runcicantellated alternated truncation
20	Snub rectified	sr{p,q,2r}	[(p,q)^{+},2r]		Alternated truncated rectification
21		ht_{0,3}{2p,q,2r}	[(2p,q,2r,2^{+})]		Alternated runcination
22	Bisnub	2s{2p,q,2r}	[2p,q^{+},2r]		Alternated bitruncation
23	Omnisnub	ht_{0,1,2,3}{p,q,r}	[p,q,r]^{+}		Alternated omnitruncation
24	Half	h{2p,3,q}	[1^{+},2p,3,q] =[(3,p,3),q]		Alternation of, same as
25	Cantic	h_{2}{2p,3,q}	[1^{+},2p,3,q] =[(3,p,3),q]		Same as
26	Runcic	h_{3}{2p,3,q}	[1^{+},2p,3,q] =[(3,p,3),q]		Same as
27	Runcicantic	h_{2,3}{2p,3,q}	[1^{+},2p,3,q] =[(3,p,3),q]		Same as
28	Quarter	q{2p,3,2q}	[1^{+},2p,3,2q,1^{+}]		Same as

See also convex uniform honeycombs, some of which illustrate these operations as applied to the regular cubic honeycomb.

If two polytopes are duals of each other (such as the tesseract and 16-cell, or the 120-cell and 600-cell), then bitruncating, runcinating or omnitruncating either produces the same figure as the same operation to the other. Thus where only the participle appears in the table it should be understood to apply to either parent.

==== Summary of constructions by extended symmetry ====
The 46 uniform polychora constructed from the A_{4}, B_{4}, F_{4}, H_{4} symmetry are given in this table by their full extended symmetry and Coxeter diagrams. The D_{4} symmetry is also included, though it only creates duplicates. Alternations are grouped by their chiral symmetry. All alternations are given, although the snub 24-cell, with its 3 constructions from different families is the only one that is uniform. Counts in parentheses are either repeats or nonuniform. The Coxeter diagrams are given with subscript indices 1 through 46. The 3-3 and 4-4 duoprismatic family is included, the second for its relation to the B_{4} family.

Coxeter group	Extended symmetry	Polychora		Chiral extended symmetry	Alternation honeycombs	
[3,3,3]	[3,3,3] (order 120)	6	_{(1)} | _{(2)} | _{(3)} _{(4)} | _{(7)} | _{(8)}			
[3,3,3]	[2^{+}[3,3,3]] (order 240)	3	_{(5)}| _{(6)} | _{(9)}	[2^{+}[3,3,3]]^{+} (order 120)	(1)	_{(−)}
[3,3^{1,1}]	[3,3^{1,1}] (order 192)	0	(none)			
[3,3^{1,1}]	[1[3,3^{1,1}]]=[4,3,3] = (order 384)	(4)	_{(12)} | _{(17)} |_{(11)} |_{(16)}			
[3,3^{1,1}]	[3[3^{1,1,1}]]=[3,4,3] = (order 1152)	(3)	_{(22)} | _{(23)} | _{(24)}	[3[3,3^{1,1}]]^{+} =[3,4,3]^{+} (order 576)	(1)	_{(31)} (=) _{(−)}
[4,3,3]	[3[1^{+},4,3,3]]=[3,4,3] = (order 1152)	(3)	_{(22)} | _{(23)} | _{(24)}			
[4,3,3]	[4,3,3] (order 384)	12	_{(10)} | _{(11)} | _{(12)} | _{(13)} | _{(14)} _{(15)} | _{(16)} | _{(17)} | _{(18)} | _{(19)} _{(20)} | _{(21)}	[1^{+},4,3,3]^{+} (order 96)	(2)	_{(12)} (=) _{(31)} _{(−)}
[4,3,3]	[4,3,3] (order 384)	12	_{(10)} | _{(11)} | _{(12)} | _{(13)} | _{(14)} _{(15)} | _{(16)} | _{(17)} | _{(18)} | _{(19)} _{(20)} | _{(21)}	[4,3,3]^{+} (order 192)	(1)	_{(−)}
[3,4,3]	[3,4,3] (order 1152)	6	_{(22)} | _{(23)} | _{(24)} _{(25)} | _{(28)} | _{(29)}	[2^{+}[3^{+},4,3^{+}]] (order 576)	1	_{(31)}
[3,4,3]	[2^{+}[3,4,3]] (order 2304)	3	_{(26)} | _{(27)} | _{(30)}	[2^{+}[3,4,3]]^{+} (order 1152)	(1)	_{(−)}
[5,3,3]	[5,3,3] (order 14400)	15	_{(32)} | _{(33)} | _{(34)} | _{(35)} | _{(36)} _{(37)} | _{(38)} | _{(39)} | _{(40)} | _{(41)} _{(42)} | _{(43)} | _{(44)} | _{(45)} | _{(46)}	[5,3,3]^{+} (order 7200)	(1)	_{(−)}
[3,2,3]	[3,2,3] (order 36)	0	(none)	[3,2,3]^{+} (order 18)	0	(none)
[3,2,3]	[2^{+}[3,2,3]] (order 72)	0		[2^{+}[3,2,3]]^{+} (order 36)	0	(none)
[3,2,3]	[[3],2,3]=[6,2,3] = (order 72)	1		[1[3,2,3]]=[[3],2,3]^{+}=[6,2,3]^{+} (order 36)	(1)	
[3,2,3]	[(2^{+},4)[3,2,3]]=[2^{+}[6,2,6]] = (order 288)	1		[(2^{+},4)[3,2,3]]^{+}=[2^{+}[6,2,6]]^{+} (order 144)	(1)	
[4,2,4]	[4,2,4] (order 64)	0	(none)	[4,2,4]^{+} (order 32)	0	(none)
[4,2,4]	[2^{+}[4,2,4]] (order 128)	0	(none)	[2^{+}[(4,2^{+},4,2^{+})]] (order 64)	0	(none)
[4,2,4]	[(3,3)[4,2*,4]]=[4,3,3] = (order 384)	(1)	_{(10)}	[(3,3)[4,2*,4]]^{+}=[4,3,3]^{+} (order 192)	(1)	_{(12)}
[4,2,4]	[[4],2,4]=[8,2,4] = (order 128)	(1)		[1[4,2,4]]=[[4],2,4]^{+}=[8,2,4]^{+} (order 64)	(1)	
[4,2,4]	[(2^{+},4)[4,2,4]]=[2^{+}[8,2,8]] = (order 512)	(1)		[(2^{+},4)[4,2,4]]^{+}=[2^{+}[8,2,8]]^{+} (order 256)	(1)	

== Uniform star polychora ==
Other than the aforementioned infinite duoprism and antiprism prism families, which have infinitely many nonconvex members, many uniform star polychora have been discovered. In 1852, Ludwig Schläfli discovered four regular star polychora: {5,3,5/2}, {5/2,3,5}, {3,3,5/2}, and {5/2,3,3}. In 1883, Edmund Hess found the other six: {3,5,5/2}, {5/2,5,3}, {5,5/2,5}, {5/2,5,5/2}, {5,5/2,3}, and {3,5/2,5}. Norman Johnson described three uniform antiprism-like star polychora in his doctoral dissertation of 1966: they are based on the three ditrigonal polyhedra sharing the edges and vertices of the regular dodecahedron. Many more have been found since then by other researchers, including Jonathan Bowers and George Olshevsky, creating a total count of 2127 known uniform star polychora at present (not counting the infinite set of duoprisms based on star polygons). There is currently no proof of the set's completeness.

== See also ==
- Convex uniform honeycomb - related infinite 4-polytopes in Euclidean 3-space.
- Convex uniform honeycombs in hyperbolic space - related infinite 4-polytopes in Hyperbolic 3-space.
- Finite regular skew polyhedra of 4-space
- Paracompact uniform honeycombs

Fundamental convex regular and uniform polytopes
Family	A_{n}	B_{n}	I_{2}(p) / D_{n}	E_{6} / E_{7} / E_{8} / F_{4} / G_{2}	H_{n}
Regular polygon	Triangle	Square	p-gon	Hexagon	Pentagon
Uniform polyhedron	Tetrahedron	Octahedron • Cube	Demicube		Dodecahedron • Icosahedron
Uniform polychoron	Pentachoron	16-cell • Tesseract	Demitesseract	24-cell	120-cell • 600-cell
Uniform 5-polytope	5-simplex	5-orthoplex • 5-cube	5-demicube		
Uniform 6-polytope	6-simplex	6-orthoplex • 6-cube	6-demicube	1_{22} • 2_{21}	
Uniform 7-polytope	7-simplex	7-orthoplex • 7-cube	7-demicube	1_{32} • 2_{31} • 3_{21}	
Uniform 8-polytope	8-simplex	8-orthoplex • 8-cube	8-demicube	1_{42} • 2_{41} • 4_{21}	
Uniform n-polytope	n-simplex	n-orthoplex • n-cube	n-demicube	1_{k2} • 2_{k1} • k_{21}	n-pentagonal polytope
Topics: Polytope families • Regular polytope • List of regular polytopes and compounds • Polytope operations
