= Rhombicuboctahedral prism =

Rhombicuboctahedral prism
Type	Prismatic uniform polychoron
Uniform index	53
Schläfli symbol	t_{0,2,3}{3,4,2} or rr{3,4}×{} s_{2,3}{3,4,2} or s_{2}{3,4}×{}
Coxeter diagram	
Cells	28 total: 2 rr{4,3} or s_{2}{3,4} 8 {}x{3} 18 {4,3}
Faces	100 total: 16 {3} 84 {4}
Edges	120
Vertices	48
Vertex figure	Trapezoidal pyramid
Symmetry group	[4,3,2], order 96 [3^{+},4,2], order 48
Properties	convex

In geometry, a rhombicuboctahedral prism is a convex uniform polychoron (four-dimensional polytope).

It is one of 18 convex uniform polyhedral prisms created by using uniform prisms to connect pairs of Platonic solids or Archimedean solids in parallel hyperplanes.

== Images ==
Net	Schlegel diagram One rhombicuboctahedron and triangular prisms show

== Alternative names ==
- small rhombicuboctahedral prism
- (Small) rhombicuboctahedral dyadic prism (Norman W. Johnson)
- Sircope (Jonathan Bowers: for small-rhombicuboctahedral prism)
- (small) rhombicuboctahedral hyperprism

== Related polytopes ==
=== Runcic snub cubic hosochoron ===
Runcic snub cubic hosochoron
Schläfli symbol	s_{3}{2,4,3}
Coxeter diagram	
Cells	16 total: 2 t{3,3} 6 {3,3} 8 tricup
Faces	52 total: 32 {3} 12{4} 8 {6}
Edges	60
Vertices	24
Vertex figure	
Symmetry group	[4,3,2^{+}], order 48
Properties	convex

A related polychoron is the runcic snub cubic hosochoron, also known as a parabidiminished rectified tesseract, truncated tetrahedral alterprism, or truncated tetrahedral cupoliprism, s_{3}{2,4,3},. It is made from 2 truncated tetrahedra, 6 tetrahedra, and 8 triangular cupolae in the gaps, for a total of 16 cells, 52 faces, 60 edges, and 24 vertices. It is vertex-transitive, and equilateral, but not uniform, due to the cupolae. It has symmetry [2^{+},4,3], order 48.

It is related to the 16-cell in its s{2,4,3}, construction.

It can also be seen as a prismatic polytope with two parallel truncated tetrahedra in dual positions, as seen in the compound of two truncated tetrahedra. Triangular cupolae connect the triangular and hexagonal faces, and the tetrahedral connect edge-wise between.

Projection (triangular cupolae hidden)	Net
