= Symmetry number =

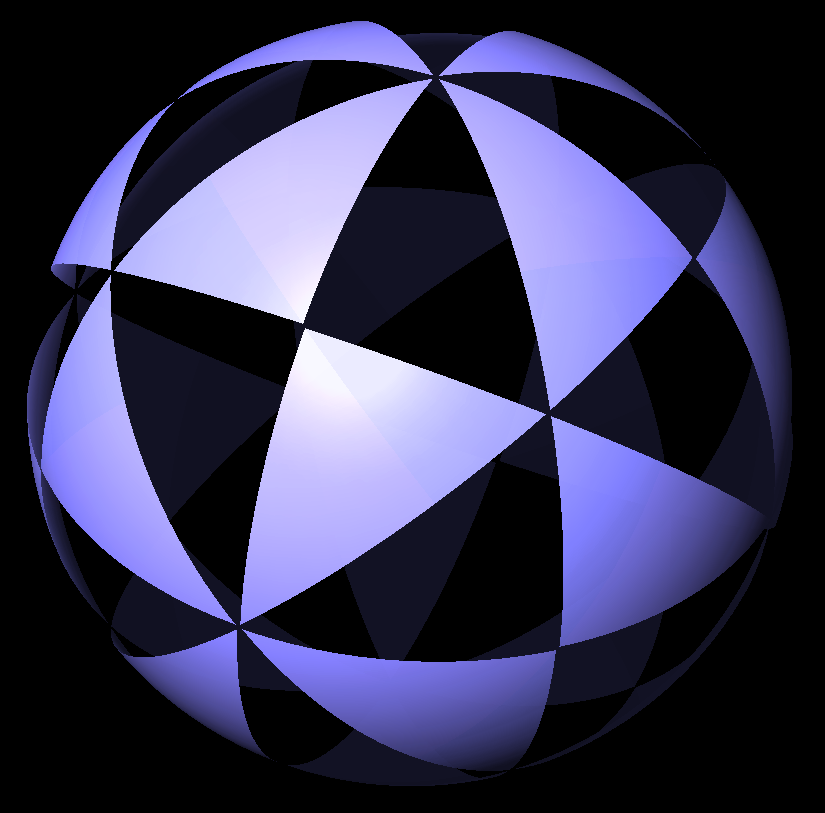
A sphere colored to show the 48 fundamental domains of octahedral symmetry.

The symmetry number or symmetry order of an object is the number of different but indistinguishable (or equivalent) arrangements (or views) of the object, that is, it is the order of its symmetry group. The object can be a molecule, crystal lattice, lattice, tiling, or in general any kind of mathematical object that admits symmetries.

In statistical thermodynamics, the symmetry number corrects for any overcounting of equivalent molecular conformations in the partition function. In this sense, the symmetry number depends upon how the partition function is formulated. For example, if one writes the partition function of ethane so that the integral includes full rotation of a methyl, then the 3-fold rotational symmetry of the methyl group contributes a factor of 3 to the symmetry number; but if one writes the partition function so that the integral includes only one rotational energy well of the methyl, then the methyl rotation does not contribute to the symmetry number.

== See also ==
- Group theory, a branch of mathematics which discusses symmetry, symmetry groups, symmetry spaces, symmetry operations
- Point groups in three dimensions
- Space group in 3 dimensions
- Molecular symmetry
- List of the 230 crystallographic 3D space groups
- Fixed points of isometry groups in Euclidean space
- Symmetric group, mathematics
- Symmetry group, mathematics
