= Boerdijk–Coxeter helix =

Linear stacking of regular tetrahedra that form helices

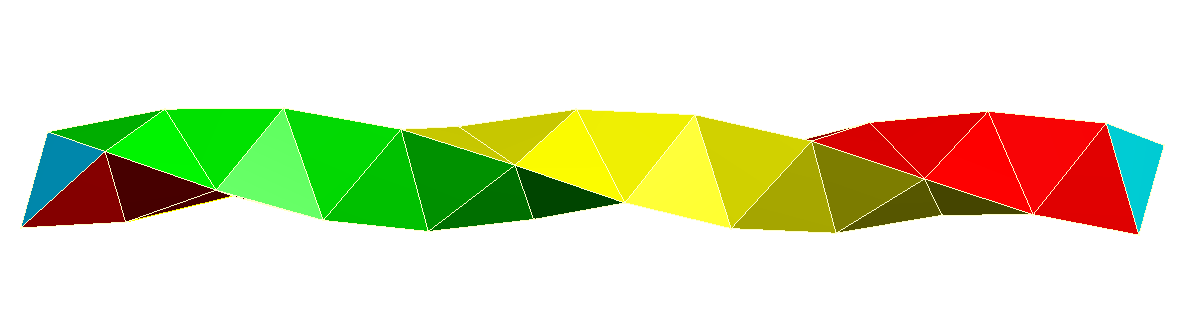
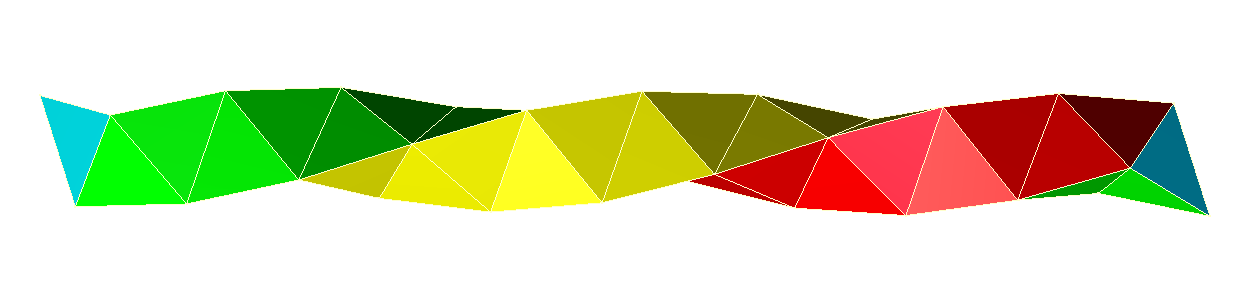
Right-handed and left-handed helices

Edges can be colored into three groups, one helix (cyan) connecting every vertex, two helices (magenta) connecting vertices in steps of two vertices, and three helices (orange) connecting vertices in steps of three vertices (see the video's Wikimedia Commons page for a detailed description of its contents).

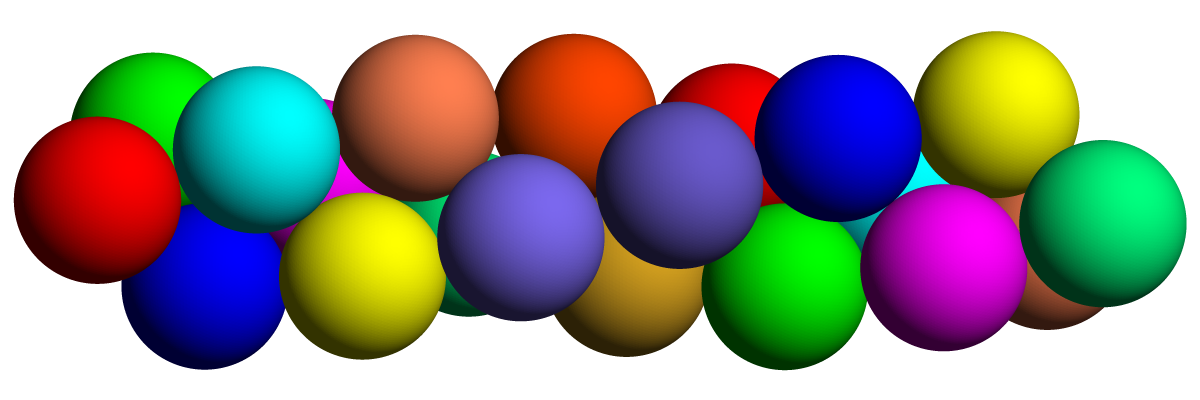
A Boerdijk helical sphere packing has each sphere centered at a vertex of the Coxeter helix. Each sphere is in contact with 6 neighboring spheres.

The Boerdijk–Coxeter helix, named after H. S. M. Coxeter and Arie Hendrick Boerdijk, is a linear stacking of regular tetrahedra, arranged so that the edges of the complex that belong to only one tetrahedron form three intertwined helices. There are two chiral forms, with either right-handed or left-handed windings. Unlike any other stacking of Platonic solids, the Boerdijk–Coxeter helix is not rotationally repetitive in 3-dimensional space. Even in an infinite string of stacked tetrahedra, no two tetrahedra will have the same orientation, because the helical pitch per cell is not a rational fraction of the circle. However, modified forms of this helix have been found which are rotationally repetitive, and in 4-dimensional space this helix repeats in rings of exactly 30 tetrahedral cells that tessellate the 3-sphere surface of the 600-cell, one of the six regular convex polychora.

Buckminster Fuller named it a tetrahelix and considered them with regular and irregular tetrahedral elements.

== Geometry ==
The vertices of the Boerdijk–Coxeter helix composed of tetrahedra with unit edge length can be written in the coordinates:
$$(r\cos n\theta,r\sin n\theta,n h)$$
where $r=3\sqrt{3}/10$, $\theta=\pm\cos^{-1}(-2/3) \approx 131.81^\circ$, $h=1/\sqrt{10}$ and $n$ is an arbitrary integer. The two different values of $\theta$ correspond to the two chiral forms. All vertices are located on the cylinder with radius $r$ along the z-axis. Given how the tetrahedra alternate, this gives an apparent twist of $2\theta - \frac{4}{3}\pi \approx 23.62^\circ$ every two tetrahedra. There is another inscribed cylinder with radius $1/\sqrt{6}$ inside the helix.

== Higher-dimensional geometry ==
The 600-cell partitions into 20 rings of 30 tetrahedra, each a Boerdijk–Coxeter helix. When superimposed onto the 3-sphere curvature it becomes periodic, with a period of ten vertices, encompassing all 30 cells. The collective of such helices in the 600-cell represent a discrete Hopf fibration. While in 3 dimensions the edges are helices, in the imposed 3-sphere topology they are geodesics and have no torsion. They spiral around each other naturally due to the Hopf fibration. The collective of edges forms another discrete Hopf fibration of 12 rings with 10 vertices each. These correspond to rings of 10 dodecahedrons in the dual 120-cell.

In addition, the 16-cell partitions into two 8-tetrahedron rings, four edges long, and the 5-cell partitions into a single degenerate 5-tetrahedron ring.

4-polytope	Rings	Tetrahedra/ring	Cycle lengths	2D Projection	3D Visualization
600-cell	20	30	30, 10^{3}, 15^{2}		
16-cell	2	8	8, 8, 4^{2}		
5-cell	1	5	(5, 5), 5		

== Related polyhedral helices ==
Equilateral square pyramids can also be chained together as a helix, with two vertex configurations, 3.4.3.4 and 3.3.4.3.3.4. This helix exists as finite ring of 30 pyramids in a 4-dimensional polytope.

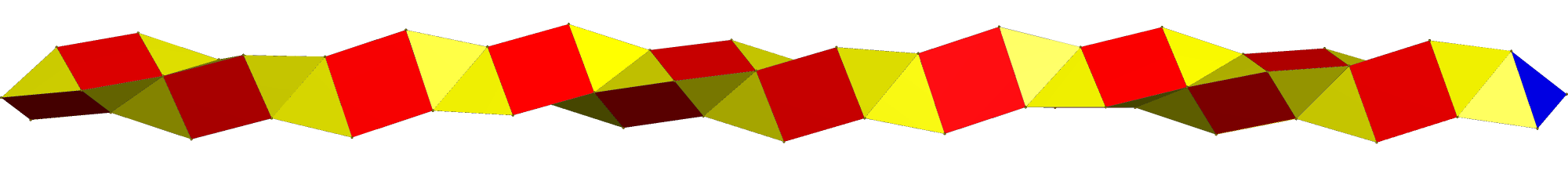

And equilateral pentagonal pyramids can be chained with 3 vertex configurations, 3.3.5, 3.5.3.5, and 3.3.3.5.3.3.5:

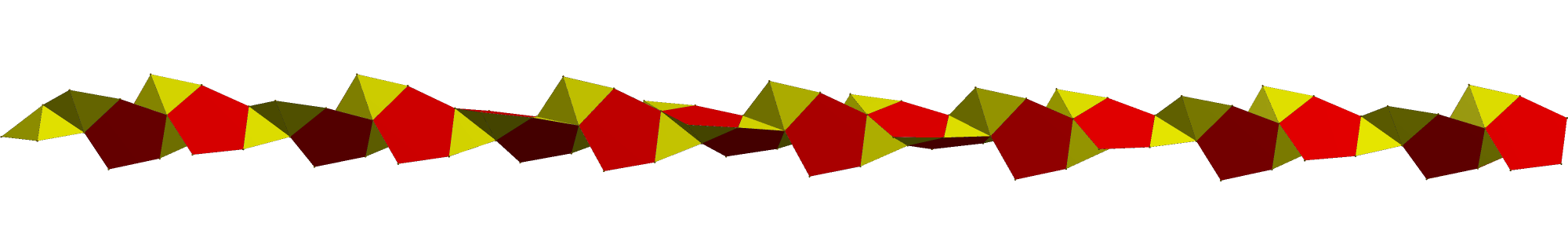

== In architecture ==
The Art Tower Mito is based on a Boerdijk–Coxeter helix.

== See also ==
- Clifford parallel cell rings
- Toroidal polyhedron
- Line group#Helical symmetry
- Skew apeirogon#Helical apeirogons in 3-dimensions
