= Triacontagon =

Polygon with 30 edges

Regular triacontagon
- A regular triacontagon
- Type: Regular polygon
- Edges and vertices: 30
- Schläfli symbol: {30}, t{15}
- Symmetry group: Dihedral (D_{30}), order 2×30
- Internal angle (degrees): 168°
- Properties: Convex, cyclic, equilateral, isogonal, isotoxal
- Dual polygon: Self

In geometry, a triacontagon or 30-gon is a thirty-sided polygon. The sum of any triacontagon's interior angles is 5040 degrees.

== Regular triacontagon ==
The regular triacontagon is a constructible polygon, by an edge-bisection of a regular pentadecagon, and can also be constructed as a truncated pentadecagon, t{15}. A truncated triacontagon, t{30}, is a hexacontagon, {60}.

One interior angle in a regular triacontagon is 168 degrees, meaning that one exterior angle would be 12°. The triacontagon is the largest regular polygon whose interior angle is the sum of the interior angles of smaller polygons: 168° is the sum of the interior angles of the equilateral triangle (60°) and the regular pentagon (108°).

The area of a regular triacontagon is (with t = edge length)

$$A = \frac{15}{2} t^2 \cot \frac{\pi}{30} = \frac{15}{4} t^2 \left(\sqrt{15} + 3\sqrt{3} + \sqrt{2}\sqrt{25+11\sqrt{5}}\right)$$

The inradius of a regular triacontagon is

$$r = \frac{1}{2} t \cot \frac{\pi}{30} = \frac{1}{4} t \left(\sqrt{15} + 3\sqrt{3} + \sqrt{2}\sqrt{25+11\sqrt{5}}\right)$$

The circumradius of a regular triacontagon is

$$R = \frac{1}{2} t \csc \frac{\pi}{30} = \frac{1}{2} t \left(2 + \sqrt{5} + \sqrt{15+6\sqrt{5}}\right)$$

=== Construction ===
Regular triacontagon with given circumcircle. D is the midpoint of AM, DC = DF, and CF, which is the side length of the regular pentagon, is E_{25}E_{1}. Since 1/30 = 1/5 - 1/6, the difference between the arcs subtended by the sides of a regular pentagon and hexagon (E_{25}E_{1} and E_{25}A) is that of the regular triacontagon, AE_{1}.

As 30 = 2 × 3 × 5, a regular triacontagon is constructible using a compass and straightedge.

== Symmetry ==
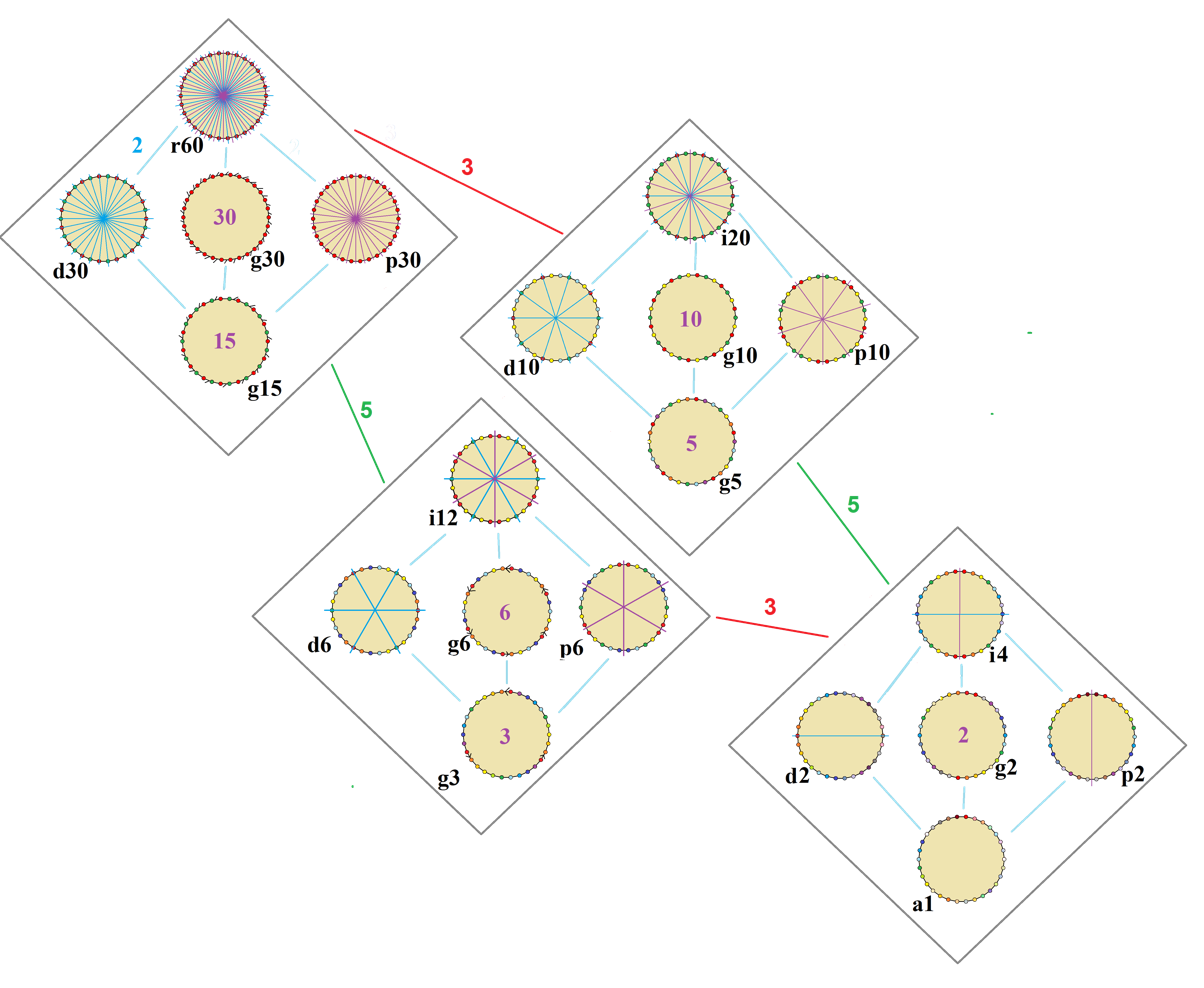
The symmetries of a regular triacontagon as shown with colors on edges and vertices. Lines of reflections are blue through vertices, and purple through edges. Gyrations are given as numbers in the center. Vertices are colored by their symmetry positions. Subgroup symmetries are connected by colored lines, index 2, 3, and 5.

The regular triacontagon has Dih_{30} dihedral symmetry, order 60, represented by 30 lines of reflection. Dih_{30} has 7 dihedral subgroups: Dih_{15}, (Dih_{10}, Dih_{5}), (Dih_{6}, Dih_{3}), and (Dih_{2}, Dih_{1}). It also has eight more cyclic symmetries as subgroups: (Z_{30}, Z_{15}), (Z_{10}, Z_{5}), (Z_{6}, Z_{3}), and (Z_{2}, Z_{1}), with Z_{n} representing π/n radian rotational symmetry.

John Conway labels these lower symmetries with a letter and order of the symmetry follows the letter. He gives d (diagonal) with mirror lines through vertices, p with mirror lines through edges (perpendicular), i with mirror lines through both vertices and edges, and g for rotational symmetry. a1 labels no symmetry.

These lower symmetries allows degrees of freedoms in defining irregular triacontagons. Only the g30 subgroup has no degrees of freedom but can be seen as directed edges.

== Dissection ==
30-gon with 420 rhombs

Coxeter states that every zonogon (a 2m-gon whose opposite sides are parallel and of equal length) can be dissected into m(m-1)/2 parallelograms. In particular this is true for regular polygons with evenly many sides, in which case the parallelograms are all rhombi. For the regular triacontagon, m=15, it can be divided into 105: 7 sets of 15 rhombs. This decomposition is based on a Petrie polygon projection of a 15-cube.

Examples

== Triacontagram ==
A triacontagram is a 30-sided star polygon (though the word is extremely rare). There are 3 regular forms given by Schläfli symbols {30/7}, {30/11}, and {30/13}, and 11 compound star figures with the same vertex configuration.

Compounds and stars
Form	Compounds					Star polygon	Compound
Picture	{30/2}=2{15}	{30/3}=3{10}	{30/4}=2{15/2}	{30/5}=5{6}	{30/6}=6{5}	{30/7}	{30/8}=2{15/4}
Interior angle	156°	144°	132°	120°	108°	96°	84°
Form	Compounds		Star polygon	Compound	Star polygon	Compounds	
Picture	{30/9}=3{10/3}	{30/10}=10{3}	{30/11}	{30/12}=6{5/2}	{30/13}	{30/14}=2{15/7}	{30/15}=15{2}
Interior angle	72°	60°	48°	36°	24°	12°	0°

There are also isogonal triacontagrams constructed as deeper truncations of the regular pentadecagon {15} and pentadecagram {15/7}, and inverted pentadecagrams {15/11}, and {15/13}. Other truncations form double coverings: t{15/14}={30/14}=2{15/7}, t{15/8}={30/8}=2{15/4}, t{15/4}={30/4}=2{15/4}, and t{15/2}={30/2}=2{15}.

Compounds and stars
Quasiregular	Isogonal	Quasiregular Double coverings
t{15} = {30}		t{15/14}=2{15/7}
t{15/7}={30/7}		t{15/8}=2{15/4}
t{15/11}={30/11}		t{15/4}=2{15/2}
t{15/13}={30/13}		t{15/2}=2{15}

== Petrie polygons ==
The regular triacontagon is the Petrie polygon for three 8-dimensional polytopes with E_{8} symmetry, shown in orthogonal projections in the E_{8} Coxeter plane. It is also the Petrie polygon for two 4-dimensional polytopes, shown in the H_{4} Coxeter plane.

E_{8}			H_{4}	
4_{21}	2_{41}	1_{42}	120-cell	600-cell

The regular triacontagram {30/7} is also the Petrie polygon for the great grand stellated 120-cell and grand 600-cell.
