= Polytetrahedron =

Solid objects based on tetrahedrons

Polytetrahedron is a term used for three distinct types of objects, all based on the tetrahedron:

- A regular convex 4-polytope made up of 600 tetrahedral cells. It is more commonly known as a 600-cell or hexacosichoron.
- A polyform of regular tetrahedra.
- In origami, a polypolyhedron is "a compound of multiple linked polyhedral skeletons with uniform nonintersecting edges". There exist two topologically distinct polytetrahedra, each made up of four intersecting triangles.

== See also ==
- Compound of five tetrahedra
- Compound of ten tetrahedra

== Bibliography ==
- Sloane, N. J. A. (ed.). "Sequence A119602 (Number of nonisomorphic polytetrahedra with n identical regular tetrahedra connected face-to-face and/or edge-to-edge (chiral shapes counted twice))". The On-Line Encyclopedia of Integer Sequences. OEIS Foundation.
- Lang, Robert J (2001). Polypolyhedra in Origami (PDF). 3OSME. Archived (PDF) from the original on July 30, 2025.
