= Wigner–Seitz cell =

Primitive cell of crystal lattices with Voronoi decomposition applied

The Wigner–Seitz cell, named after Eugene Wigner and Frederick Seitz, is a primitive cell which has been constructed by applying Voronoi decomposition to a crystal lattice. It is used in the study of crystalline materials in crystallography.

Wigner–Seitz primitive cell for different angle parallelogram lattices.

The unique property of a crystal is that its atoms are arranged in a regular three-dimensional array called a lattice. All the properties attributed to crystalline materials stem from this highly ordered structure. Such a structure exhibits discrete translational symmetry. In order to model and study such a periodic system, one needs a mathematical "handle" to describe the symmetry and hence draw conclusions about the material properties consequent to this symmetry. The Wigner–Seitz cell is a means to achieve this.

A Wigner–Seitz cell is an example of a primitive cell, which is a unit cell containing exactly one lattice point. For any given lattice, there are an infinite number of possible primitive cells. However there is only one Wigner–Seitz cell for any given lattice. It is the locus of points in space that are closer to that lattice point than to any of the other lattice points.

A Wigner–Seitz cell, like any primitive cell, is a fundamental domain for the discrete translation symmetry of the lattice. The primitive cell of the reciprocal lattice in momentum space is called the Brillouin zone.

== Overview ==
=== Background ===
The concept of Voronoi decomposition was investigated by Peter Gustav Lejeune Dirichlet, leading to the name Dirichlet domain. Further contributions were made from Evgraf Fedorov (Fedorov polyhedron or parallelohedron), Georgy Voronoy (Voronoi polyhedron), and Paul Niggli (Wirkungsbereich).

The application to condensed matter physics was first proposed by Eugene Wigner and Frederick Seitz in a 1933 paper, where it was used to solve the Schrödinger equation for free electrons in elemental sodium. They approximated the shape of the Wigner–Seitz cell in sodium, which is a truncated octahedron, as a sphere of equal volume, and solved the Schrödinger equation exactly using periodic boundary conditions, which required $d \psi/d r=0$ at the surface of the sphere. A similar calculation which also accounted for the non-spherical nature of the Wigner–Seitz cell was performed later by John C. Slater.

There are only five topologically distinct polyhedra which tile three-dimensional space, $\R^3$. These are referred to as the parallelohedra. They are the subject of mathematical interest, such as in higher dimensions. These five parallelohedra can be used to classify the three dimensional lattices using the concept of a projective plane, as suggested by John Horton Conway and Neil Sloane. However, while a topological classification considers any affine transformation to lead to an identical class, a more specific classification leads to 24 distinct classes of voronoi polyhedra with parallel edges which tile space. For example, the rectangular cuboid, right square prism, and cube belong to the same topological class, but are distinguished by different ratios of their sides. This classification of the 24 types of voronoi polyhedra for Bravais lattices was first laid out by Boris Delaunay.

=== Definition ===
The Wigner–Seitz cell around a lattice point is defined as the locus of points in space that are closer to that lattice point than to any of the other lattice points.

It can be shown mathematically that a Wigner–Seitz cell is a primitive cell. This implies that the cell spans the entire direct space without leaving any gaps or holes, a property known as tessellation.

== Constructing the cell ==
Construction of a Wigner–Seitz primitive cell.

The general mathematical concept embodied in a Wigner–Seitz cell is more commonly called a Voronoi cell, and the partition of the plane into these cells for a given set of point sites is known as a Voronoi diagram.

The construction process for the Wigner–Seitz cell of a hexagonal lattice.

The cell may be chosen by first picking a lattice point. After a point is chosen, lines are drawn to all nearby lattice points. At the midpoint of each line, another line is drawn normal to each of the first set of lines. The smallest area enclosed in this way is called the Wigner–Seitz primitive cell.

For a 3-dimensional lattice, the steps are analogous, but in step 2 instead of drawing perpendicular lines, perpendicular planes are drawn at the midpoint of the lines between the lattice points.

As in the case of all primitive cells, all area or space within the lattice can be filled by Wigner–Seitz cells and there will be no gaps.

Nearby lattice points are continually examined until the area or volume enclosed is the correct area or volume for a primitive cell. Alternatively, if the basis vectors of the lattice are reduced using lattice reduction only a set number of lattice points need to be used. In two-dimensions only the lattice points that make up the 4 unit cells that share a vertex with the origin need to be used. In three-dimensions only the lattice points that make up the 8 unit cells that share a vertex with the origin need to be used.

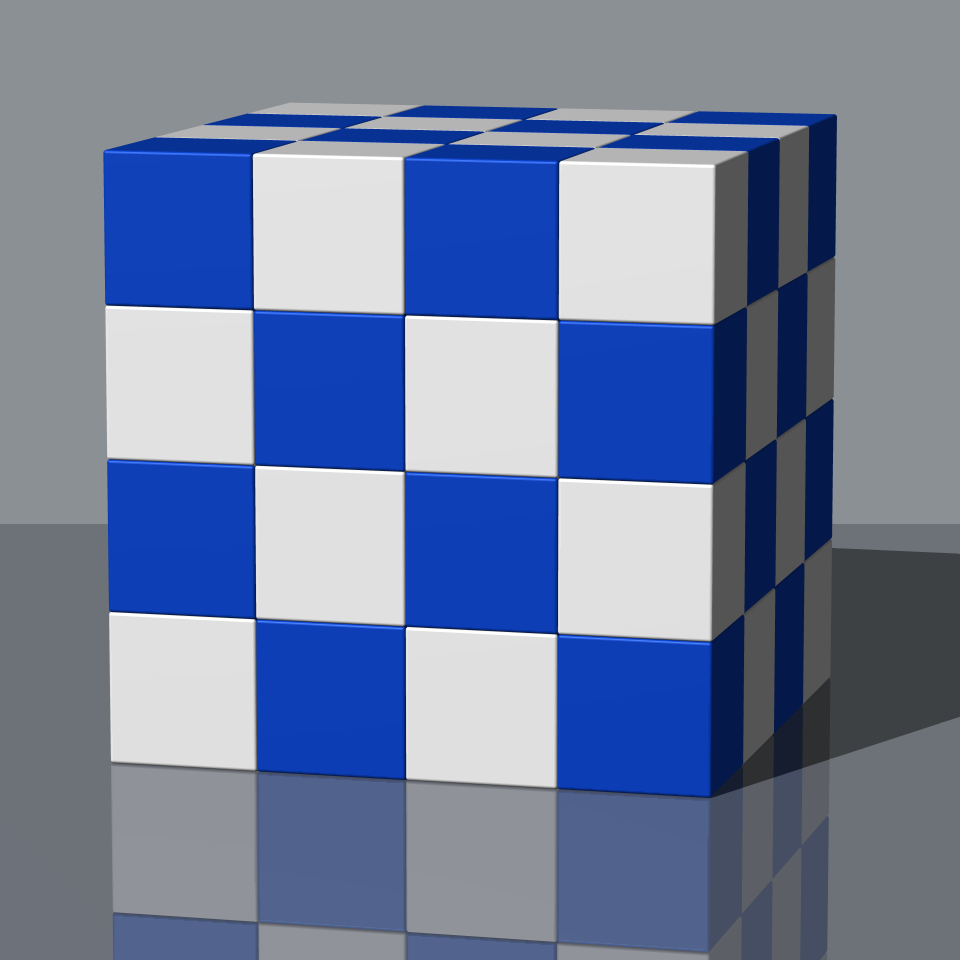
The Wigner–Seitz cell of the primitive cubic lattice is a cube. In mathematics, it is known as the cubic honeycomb.

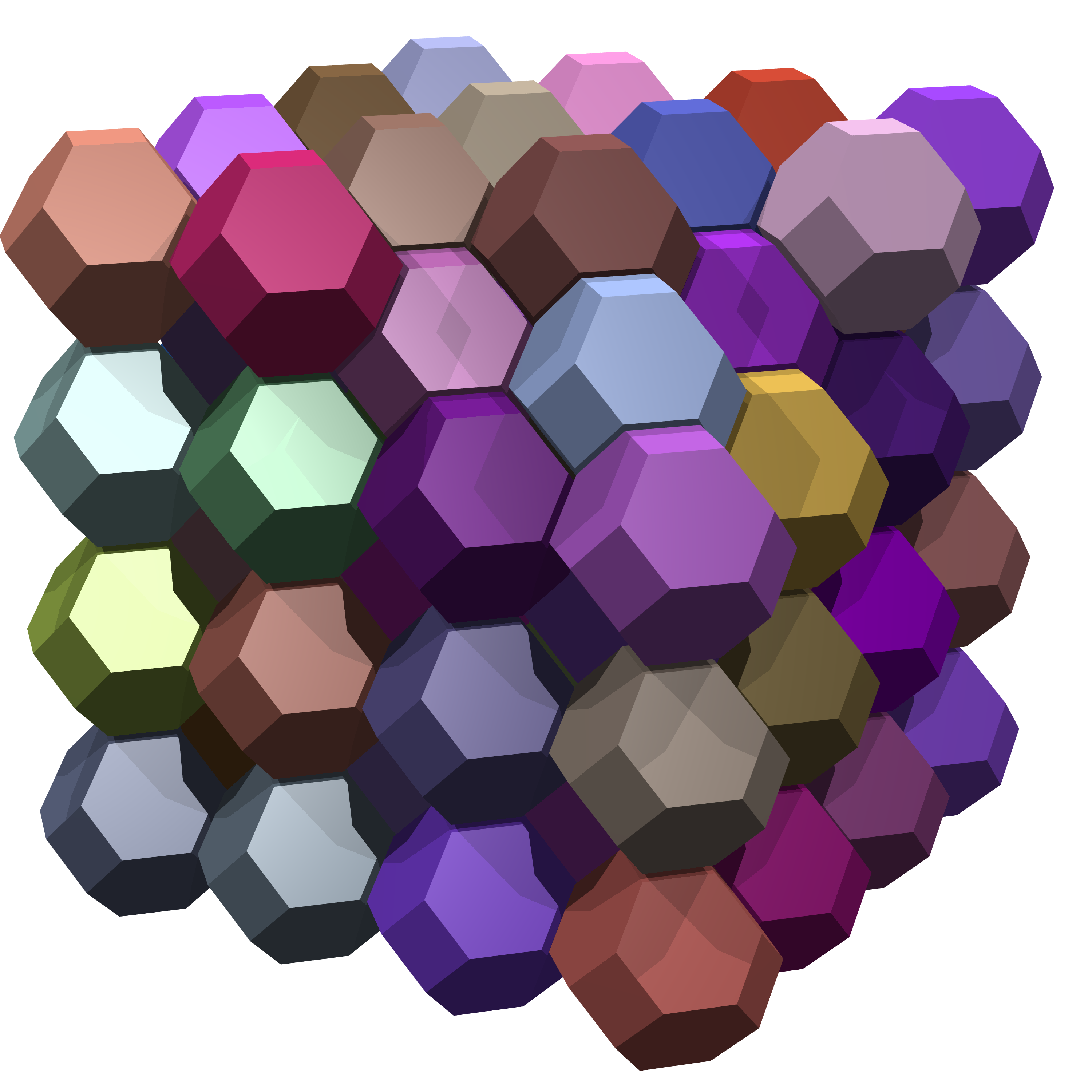
The Wigner–Seitz cell of the body-centered cubic lattice is a truncated octahedron. In mathematics, it is known as the bitruncated cubic honeycomb.

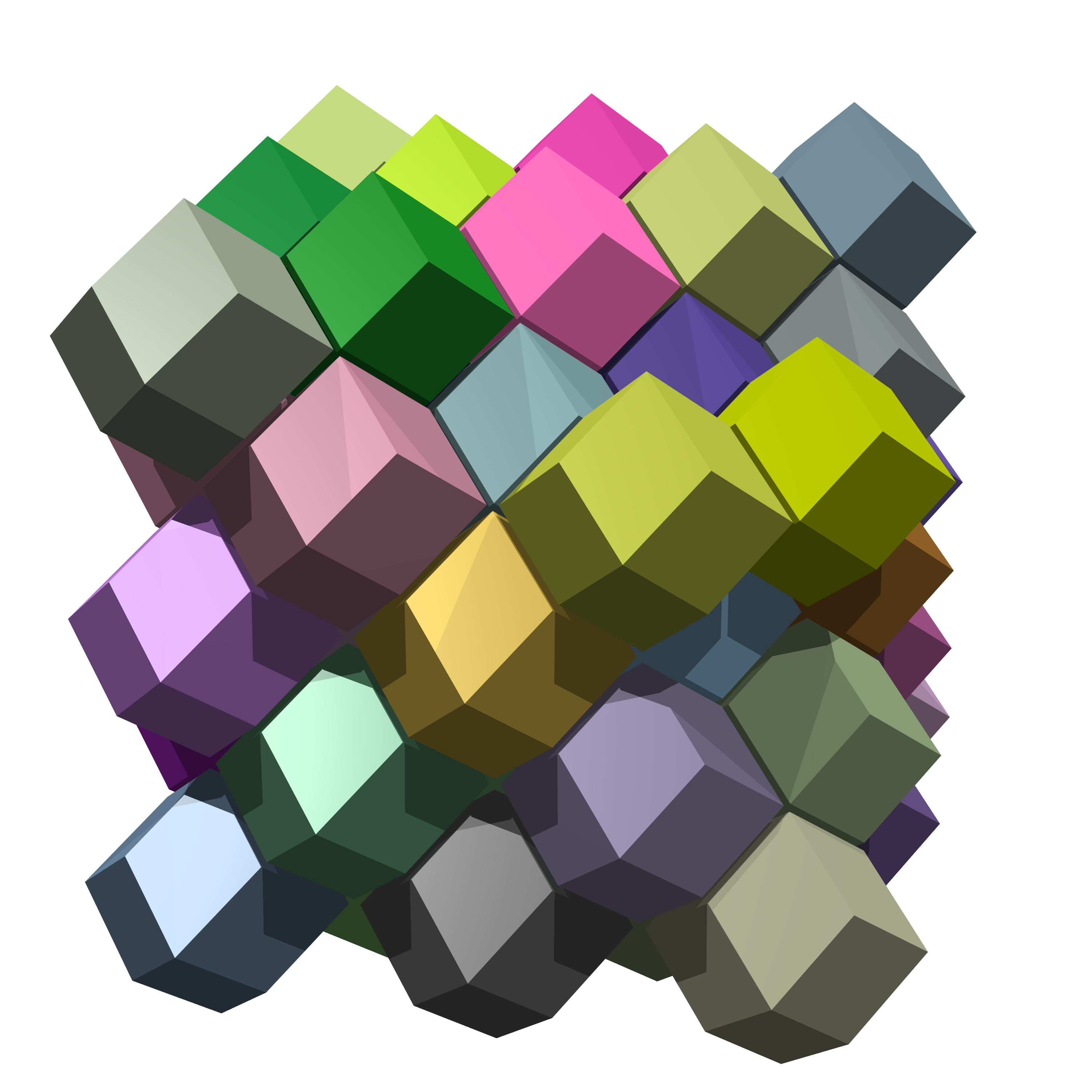
The Wigner–Seitz cell of the face-centered cubic lattice is a rhombic dodecahedron. In mathematics, it is known as the rhombic dodecahedral honeycomb.

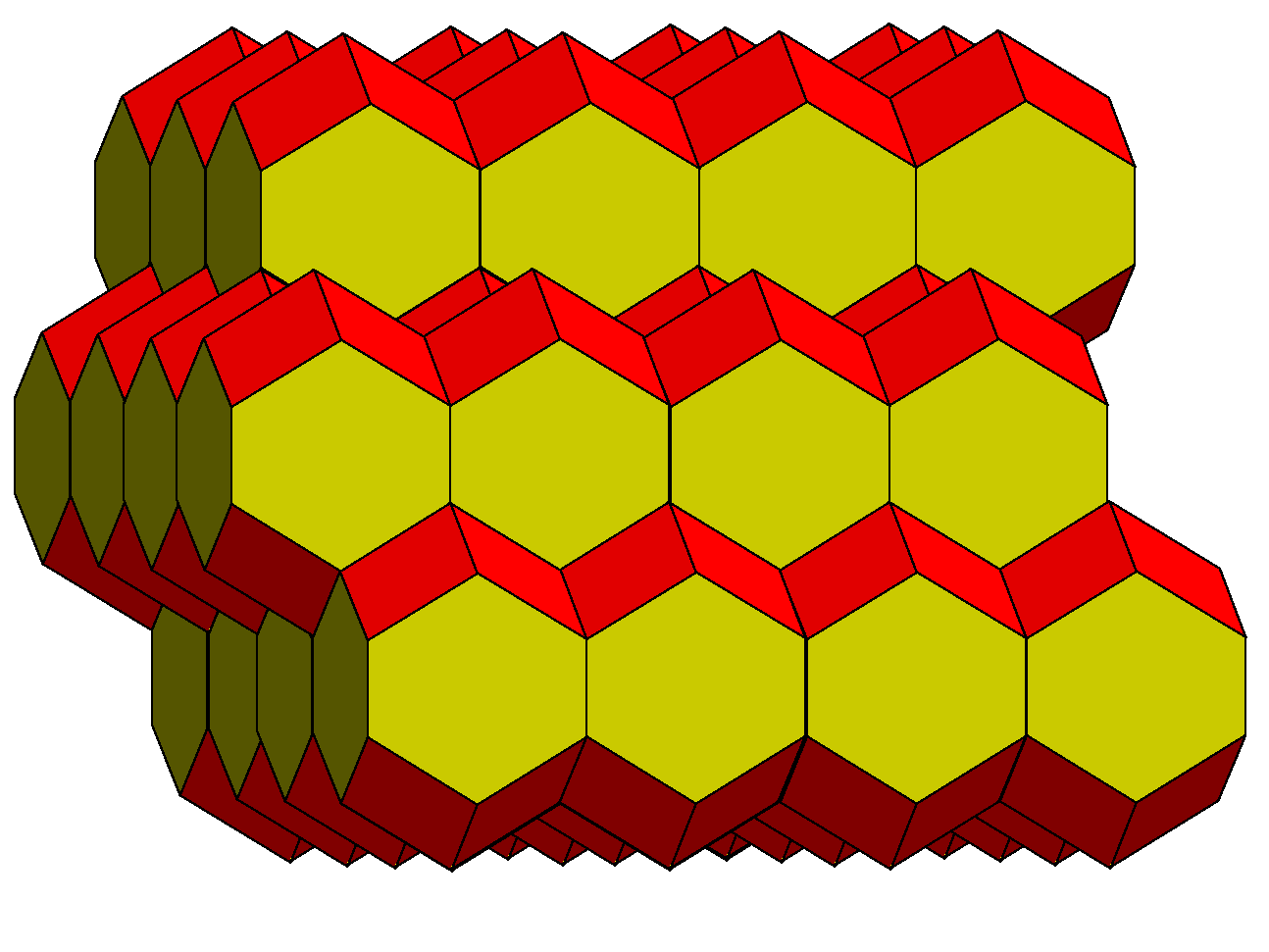
The Wigner–Seitz cell of the body-centered tetragonal lattice that has lattice constants with $c/a > \sqrt{2}$ is the elongated dodecahedron.

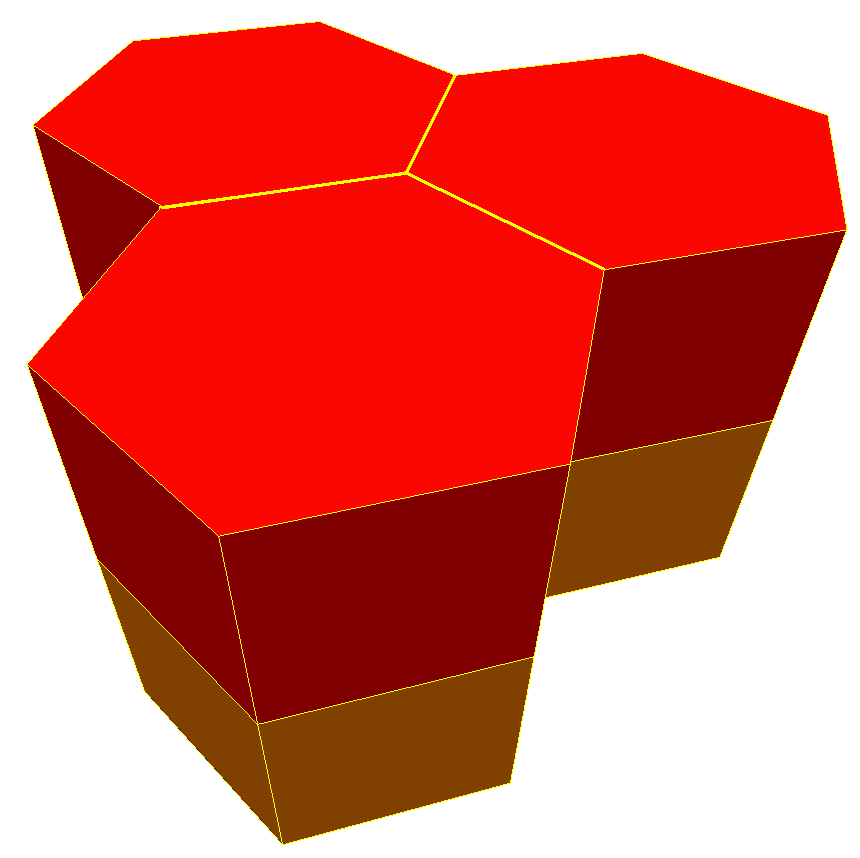
The Wigner–Seitz cell of the primitive hexagonal lattice is the hexagonal prism. In mathematics, it is known as the hexagonal prismatic honeycomb.

The shape of the Wigner–Seitz cell for any Bravais lattice takes the form of one of the 24 Voronoi polyhedra. For specifying additional constraints, $a, b, c, \alpha, \beta$ are the unit cell parameters, and $\vec a_1, \vec a_2, \vec a_3, \vec a_4$ are the basis vectors.
		Topological class (the affine equivalent parallelohedron)				
		Truncated octahedron	Elongated dodecahedron	Rhombic dodecahedron	Hexagonal prism	Cube
Bravais lattice	Primitive cubic					Any
Bravais lattice	Face-centered cubic			Any		
Bravais lattice	Body-centered cubic	Any				
Bravais lattice	Primitive hexagonal				Any	
Bravais lattice	Primitive rhombohedral	$\alpha > 90^\circ$		$\alpha < 90^\circ$		
Bravais lattice	Primitive tetragonal					Any
Bravais lattice	Body-centered tetragonal	$c/a < \sqrt{2}$	$c/a > \sqrt{2}$			
Bravais lattice	Primitive orthorhombic					Any
Bravais lattice	Base-centered orthorhombic				Any	
Bravais lattice	Face-centered orthorhombic	Any				
Bravais lattice	Body-centered orthorhombic	$c^2 < a^2 + b^2$	$c^2 > a^2 + b^2$	$c^2 = a^2 + b^2$		
Bravais lattice	Primitive monoclinic				Any	
Bravais lattice	Base-centered monoclinic	$a < b$	$a > b$, $a^2 - b^2 > 2ac \cos\beta$	$a > b$, $a^2 - b^2 = 2ac\cos\beta$		
Bravais lattice	Base-centered monoclinic	$a > b$, $a^2 - b^2 < 2ac\cos\beta$	$a=b$			
Bravais lattice	Primitive triclinic	$\vec a_i \cdot \vec a_j \neq 0$ $i, j \in \{1,2,3,4\}$ where $i \neq j$	$\vec a_i \cdot \vec a_j = 0$ one time	$\vec a_i \cdot \vec a_j = 0 =\vec a_k \cdot \vec a_l$ $i, j, k, l \in \{1,2,3,4\}$ where $i \neq j \neq k \neq l$		

== Composite lattices ==
For composite lattices, (crystals which have more than one vector in their basis) each single lattice point represents multiple atoms. We can break apart each Wigner–Seitz cell into subcells by further Voronoi decomposition according to the closest atom, instead of the closest lattice point. For example, the diamond crystal structure contains a two atom basis. In diamond, carbon atoms have tetrahedral sp^{3} bonding, but since tetrahedra do not tile space, the voronoi decomposition of the diamond crystal structure is actually the triakis truncated tetrahedral honeycomb. Another example is applying Voronoi decomposition to the atoms in the A15 phases, which forms the polyhedral approximation of the Weaire–Phelan structure.

== Symmetry ==
The Wigner–Seitz cell always has the same point symmetry as the underlying Bravais lattice. For example, the cube, truncated octahedron, and rhombic dodecahedron have point symmetry O_{h}, since the respective Bravais lattices used to generate them all belong to the cubic lattice system, which has O_{h} point symmetry.

== Brillouin zone ==
In practice, the Wigner–Seitz cell itself is actually rarely used as a description of direct space, where the conventional unit cells are usually used instead. However, the same decomposition is extremely important when applied to reciprocal space. The Wigner–Seitz cell in the reciprocal space is called the Brillouin zone, which is used in constructing band diagrams to determine whether a material will be a conductor, semiconductor or an insulator.

== See also ==
- Delaunay triangulation
- Coordination geometry
- Crystal field theory
- Wigner crystal
