= Stereohedron =

Convex polyhedron that fills space isohedrally

In geometry and crystallography, a stereohedron is a convex polyhedron that fills space isohedrally, meaning that the symmetries of the tiling take any copy of the stereohedron to any other copy.

Two-dimensional analogues to the stereohedra are called planigons. Higher dimensional polytopes can also be stereohedra, while they would more accurately be called stereotopes.

== Plesiohedra ==
A subset of stereohedra are called plesiohedrons, defined as the Voronoi cells of a symmetric Delone set.

Parallelohedrons are plesiohedra which are space-filling by translation only. Edges here are colored as parallel vectors.

Parallelohedra
cube	hexagonal prism	rhombic dodecahedron	elongated dodecahedron	truncated octahedron

== Other periodic stereohedra ==
The catoptric tessellation contain stereohedra cells. Dihedral angles are integer divisors of 180°, and are colored by their order. The first three are the fundamental domains of ${\tilde{C}}_3$, ${\tilde{B}}_3$, and ${\tilde{A}}_3$ symmetry, represented by Coxeter-Dynkin diagrams:, and. ${\tilde{B}}_3$ is a half symmetry of ${\tilde{C}}_3$, and ${\tilde{A}}_3$ is a quarter symmetry.

Any space-filling stereohedra with symmetry elements can be dissected into smaller identical cells which are also stereohedra. The name modifiers below, half, quarter, and eighth represent such dissections.

Catoptric cells
Faces	4				5			6				8	12
Type	Tetrahedra				Square pyramid			Triangular bipyramid		Cube		Octahedron	Rhombic dodecahedron
Images	1/48 (1)	1/24 (2)	1/12 (4)	1/12 (4)	1/24 (2)	1/6 (8)	1/6 (8)	1/12 (4)	1/4 (12)	1 (48)	1/2 (24)	1/3 (16)	2 (96)
Symmetry (order)	C_{1} 1	C_{1v} 2	D_{2d} 4	C_{1v} 2	C_{1v} 2	C_{4v} 8	C_{2v} 4	C_{2v} 4	C_{3v} 6	O_{h} 48	D_{3d} 12	D_{4h} 16	O_{h} 48
Honeycomb	Eighth pyramidille	Triangular pyramidille	Oblate tetrahedrille	Half pyramidille	Square quarter pyramidille	Pyramidille	Half oblate octahedrille	Quarter oblate octahedrille	Quarter cubille	Cubille	Oblate cubille	Oblate octahedrille	Dodecahedrille

Other convex polyhedra that are stereohedra but not parallelohedra nor plesiohedra include the gyrobifastigium.

Others
Faces	8		10	12
Symmetry (order)	D_{2d} (8)			D_{4h} (16)
Images				
Cell	Gyrobifastigium	Elongated gyrobifastigium	Ten of diamonds	Elongated square bipyramid
