= Plesiohedron =

Type of space-filling polyhedron

In geometry, a plesiohedron is a special kind of space-filling polyhedron, defined as the Voronoi cell of a symmetric Delone set. Three-dimensional Euclidean space can be completely filled by copies of any one of these shapes, with no overlaps. The resulting honeycomb will have symmetries that take any copy of the plesiohedron to any other copy.

The plesiohedra include the cube, hexagonal prism, rhombic dodecahedron, and truncated octahedron. The largest number of faces that a plesiohedron can have is 38.

== Definition ==
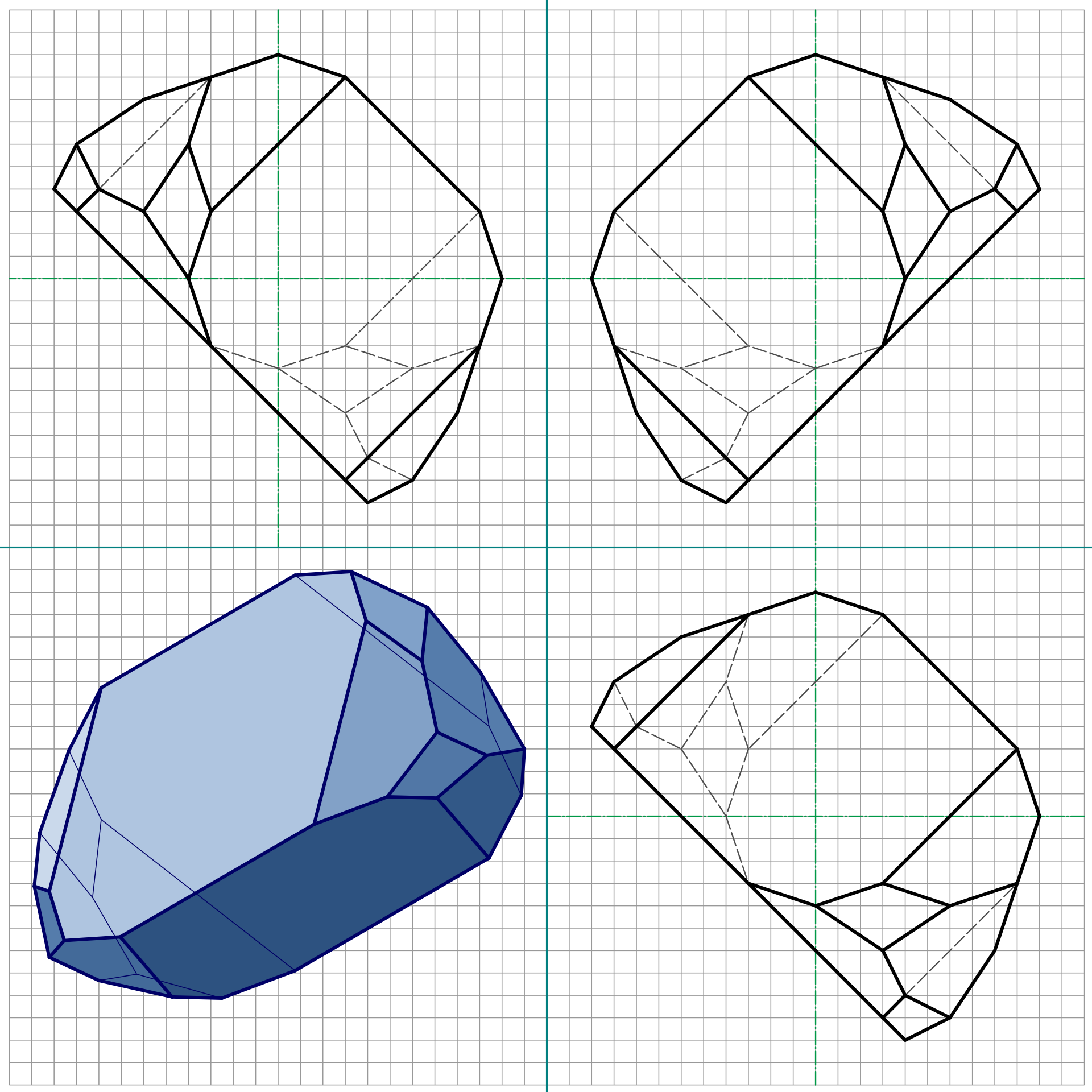
A 17-sided plesiohedron and its honeycomb, the Voronoi diagram of the Laves graph

A set $S$ of points in Euclidean space is a Delone set if there exists a number $\varepsilon>0$ such that every two points of $S$ are at least at distance $\varepsilon$ apart from each other and such that every point of space is within distance $1/\varepsilon$ of at least one point in $S$. So $S$ fills space, but its points never come too close to each other. For this to be true, $S$ must be infinite. Additionally, the set $S$ is symmetric (in the sense needed to define a plesiohedron) if, for every two points $p$ and $q$ of $S$, there exists a rigid motion of space that takes $S$ to $S$ and $p$ to $q$. That is, the symmetries of $S$ act transitively on $S$.

The Voronoi diagram of any set $S$ of points partitions space into regions called Voronoi cells that are nearer to one given point of $S$ than to any other. When $S$ is a Delone set, the Voronoi cell of each point $p$ in $S$ is a convex polyhedron. The faces of this polyhedron lie on the planes that perpendicularly bisect the line segments from $p$ to other nearby points of $S$.

When $S$ is symmetric as well as being Delone, the Voronoi cells must all be congruent to each other, for the symmetries of $S$ must also be symmetries of the Voronoi diagram. In this case, the Voronoi diagram forms a honeycomb in which there is only a single prototile shape, the shape of these Voronoi cells. This shape is called a plesiohedron. The tiling generated in this way is isohedral, meaning that it not only has a single prototile ("monohedral") but also that any copy of this tile can be taken to any other copy by a symmetry of the tiling.

As with any space-filling polyhedron, the Dehn invariant of a plesiohedron is necessarily zero.

== Examples ==
The plesiohedra include the five parallelohedra. These are polyhedra that can tile space in such a way that every tile is symmetric to every other tile by a translational symmetry, without rotation. Equivalently, they are the Voronoi cells of lattices, as these are the translationally-symmetric Delone sets. Plesiohedra are a special case of the stereohedra, the prototiles of isohedral tilings more generally. For this reason (and because Voronoi diagrams are also known as Dirichlet tesselations) they have also been called "Dirichlet stereohedra"

There are only finitely many combinatorial types of plesiohedron. Notable individual plesiohedra include:

- The five parallelohedra: the cube (or more generally the parallelepiped), hexagonal prism, rhombic dodecahedron, elongated dodecahedron, and truncated octahedron.
- The triangular prism, the prototile of the triangular prismatic honeycomb. More generally, each of the 11 types of Laves tiling of the plane by congruent convex polygons (and each of the subtypes of these tilings with different symmetry groups) can be realized as the Voronoi cells of a symmetric Delone set in the plane. It follows that the prisms over each of these shapes are plesiohedra. As well as the triangular prisms, these include prisms over certain quadrilaterals, pentagons, and hexagons.
- The gyrobifastigium is a stereohedron but not a plesiohedron, because the points at the centers of the cells of its face-to-face tiling (where they are forced to go by symmetry) have differently-shaped Voronoi cells. However, a flattened version of the gyrobifastigium, with faces made of isosceles right triangles and silver rectangles, is a plesiohedron.
- The triakis truncated tetrahedron, the prototile of the triakis truncated tetrahedral honeycomb and the plesiohedron generated by the diamond lattice
- The trapezo-rhombic dodecahedron, the prototile of the trapezo-rhombic dodecahedral honeycomb and the plesiohedron generated by the hexagonal close-packing
- The 17-sided Voronoi cells of the Laves graph

Many other plesiohedra are known. Two different ones with the largest known number of faces, 38, were discovered by crystallographer Peter Engel. For many years, the maximum number of faces of a plesiohedron was an open problem, but analysis of the possible symmetries of three-dimensional space has shown that this number is at most 38.

The Voronoi cells of points uniformly spaced on a helix fill space, are all congruent to each other, and can be made to have arbitrarily large numbers of faces. However, the points on a helix are not a Delone set and their Voronoi cells are not bounded polyhedra.

A modern survey is given by Schmitt.
