= Space-filling polyhedron =

Polyhedron which tiles 3D space

Examples of space-filling polyhedra
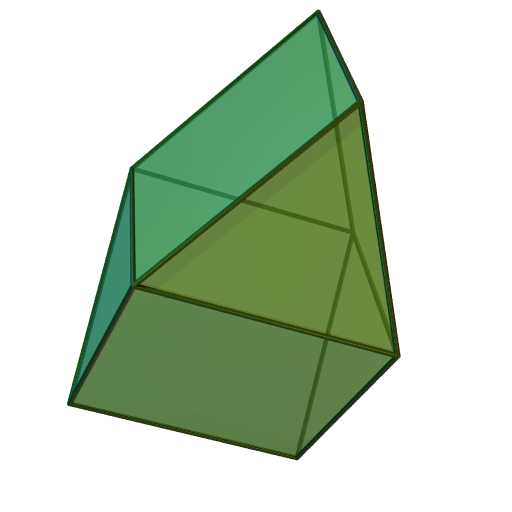
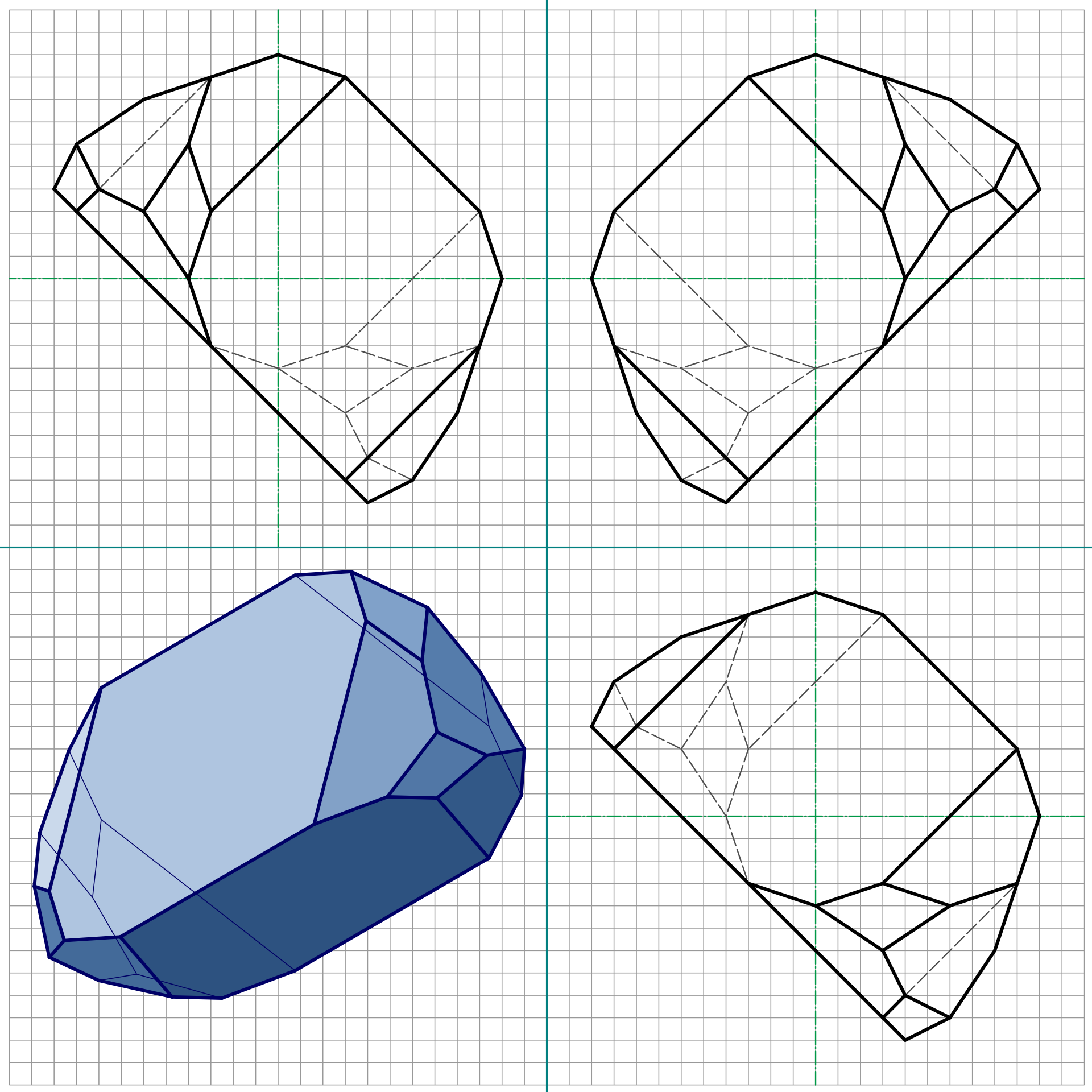
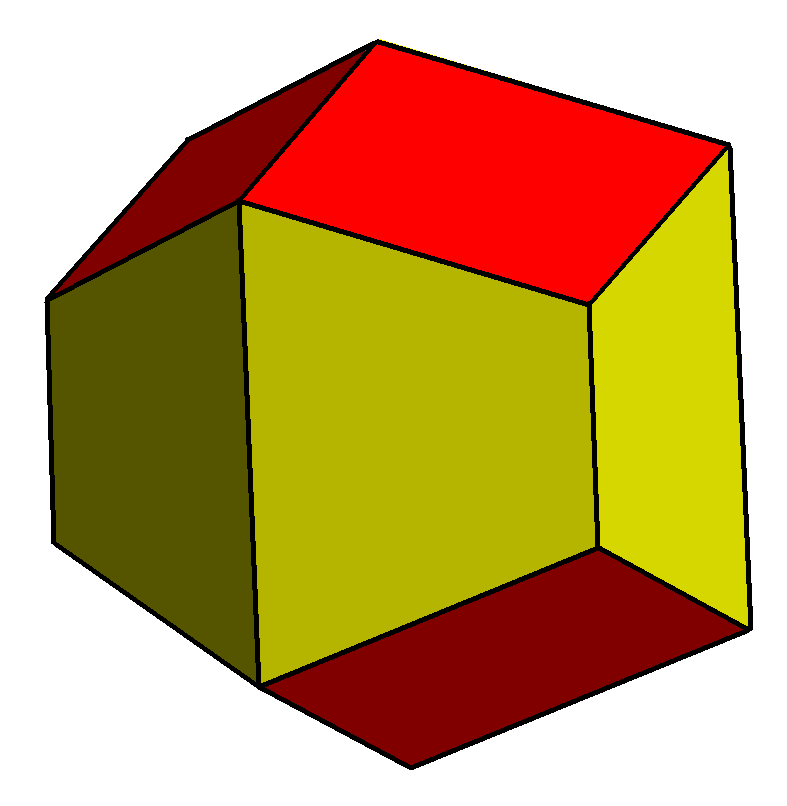
- cube gyrobifastigium 17-sided plesiohedron, the Voronoi diagram of a Laves graph trapezo-rhombic dodecahedron
- Definition: a polyhedron that fill all of three-dimensional space via translations, rotations, or reflections

In geometry, a space-filling polyhedron is a polyhedron that can be used to fill all of three-dimensional space via translations, rotations and/or reflections, where filling means that; taken together, all the instances of the polyhedron constitute a partition of three-space. Any periodic tiling or honeycomb of three-space can, in fact, be generated by translating a primitive cell polyhedron.

== Families and their examples ==
If a polygon can tile the plane, its prism is space-filling; examples include the cube, triangular prism, and the hexagonal prism. Any parallelepiped tessellates Euclidean 3-space, as do the five parallelohedra (the cube, hexagonal prism, truncated octahedron, elongated dodecahedron, and rhombic dodecahedron). Other space-filling polyhedra include the square pyramid, plesiohedra, and stereohedra, polyhedra whose tilings have symmetries taking every tile to every other tile, including the gyrobifastigium, the triakis truncated tetrahedron, and the trapezo-rhombic dodecahedron.

The cube is the only Platonic solid that can fill space, although a tiling that combines tetrahedra and octahedra (the tetrahedral-octahedral honeycomb) is possible. Although the regular tetrahedron cannot fill space, other tetrahedra can, including the Goursat tetrahedra derived from the cube, and the Hill tetrahedra.

== Characteristics ==
Every polyhedron that can space-fill has Dehn invariant zero. Relatedly, two different polyhedra can have Dehn invariants of zero, which may be able to tile each other.

== See also ==
- Hilbert's eighteenth problem, one of Hilbert's problems, consisting of three subproblems, one of which is a three-dimensional anisohedral tiling.
- Tridecahedron, a thirteen-sided polyhedron
