= Parallelotope =

In geometry, a parallelotope may refer to:

- A generalization of a parallelepiped and parallelogram
- A generalization of a parallelohedron and parallelogon, this includes all parallelohedra in the first sense

== See also ==
- Zonotope
