= Blaschke sum =

Polytope combining two smaller polytopes

In convex geometry and the geometry of convex polytopes, the Blaschke sum of two polytopes is a polytope that has a facet parallel to each facet of the two given polytopes, with the same measure. When both polytopes have parallel facets, the measure of the corresponding facet in the Blaschke sum is the sum of the measures from the two given polytopes.

Blaschke sums exist and are unique up to translation, as can be proven using the theory of the Minkowski problem for polytopes. They can be used to decompose arbitrary polytopes into simplices, and centrally symmetric polytopes into parallelotopes.

Although Blaschke sums of polytopes are used implicitly in the work of Hermann Minkowski, Blaschke sums are named for Wilhelm Blaschke, who defined a corresponding operation for smooth convex sets. The Blaschke sum operation can be extended to arbitrary convex bodies, generalizing both the polytope and smooth cases, using measures on the Gauss map.

== Definition ==
For any $d$-dimensional polytope, one can specify its collection of facet directions and measures by a finite set of $d$-dimensional nonzero vectors, one per facet, pointing perpendicularly outward from the facet, with length equal to the $(d-1)$-dimensional measure of its facet. As Hermann Minkowski proved, a finite set of nonzero vectors describes a polytope in this way if and only if it spans the whole $d$-dimensional space, no two are collinear with the same sign, and the sum of the set is the zero vector. The polytope described by this set has a unique shape, in the sense that any two polytopes described by the same set of vectors are translates of each other.

The Blaschke sum $X\# Y$ of two polytopes $X$ and $Y$ is defined by combining the vectors describing their facet directions and measures, in the obvious way: form the union of the two sets of vectors, except that when both sets contain vectors that are parallel and have the same sign, replace each such pair of parallel vectors by its sum. This operation preserves the necessary conditions for Minkowski's theorem on the existence of a polytope described by the resulting set of vectors, and this polytope is the Blaschke sum. The two polytopes need not have the same dimension as each other, as long as they are both defined in a common space of high enough dimension to contain both: lower-dimensional polytopes in a higher-dimensional space are defined in the same way by sets of vectors that span a lower-dimensional subspace of the higher-dimensional space, and these sets of vectors can be combined without regard to the dimensions of the spaces they span.

For convex polygons and line segments in the Euclidean plane, their Blaschke sum coincides with their Minkowski sum.

== Decomposition ==
Blaschke sums can be used to decompose polytopes into simpler polytopes. In particular, every $d$-dimensional convex polytope with $n$ facets can be represented as a Blaschke sum of at most $n-d$ simplices (not necessarily of the same dimension). Every $d$-dimensional centrally symmetric convex polytope can be represented as a Blaschke sum of parallelotopes. And every $d$-dimensional convex polytope can be represented as a Blaschke sum of $d$-dimensional convex polytopes, each having at most $2d$ facets.

== Generalizations ==
The Blaschke sum can be extended from polytopes to arbitrary bounded convex sets, by representing the amount of surface in each direction using a measure on the Gauss map of the set instead of using a finite set of vectors, and adding sets by adding their measures. If two bodies of constant brightness are combined in this way, the result is another body of constant brightness.

== Kneser–Süss inequality ==
The volume $V(X\# Y)$ of the Blaschke sum of two $d$-dimensional polytopes or convex bodies $X$ and $Y$ obeys an inequality known as the Kneser–Süss inequality, an analogue of the Brunn–Minkowski theorem on volumes of Minkowski sums of convex bodies:

$$V(X\# Y)^{(d-1)/d}\ge V(X)^{(d-1)/d}+V(Y)^{(d-1)/d}.$$
