= Minkowski problem for polytopes =

In the geometry of convex polytopes, the Minkowski problem for polytopes concerns the specification of the shape of a polytope by the directions and measures of its facets. The theorem that every polytope is uniquely determined up to translation by this information was proven by Hermann Minkowski; it has been called "Minkowski's theorem", although the same name has also been given to several unrelated results of Minkowski. The Minkowski problem for polytopes should also be distinguished from the Minkowski problem, on specifying convex shapes by their curvature.

== Specification and necessary conditions ==
For any $d$-dimensional polytope, one can specify its collection of facet directions and measures by a finite set of $d$-dimensional nonzero vectors, one per facet, pointing perpendicularly outward from the facet, with length equal to the $(d-1)$-dimensional measure of its facet. To be a valid specification of a bounded polytope, these vectors must span the full $d$-dimensional space, and no two can be parallel with the same sign. Additionally, their sum must be zero; this requirement corresponds to the observation that, when the polytope is projected perpendicularly onto any hyperplane, the projected measure of its top facets and its bottom facets must be equal, because the top facets project to the same set as the bottom facets.

== Minkowski's uniqueness theorem ==
It is a theorem of Hermann Minkowski that these necessary conditions are sufficient: every finite set of vectors that spans the whole space, has no two parallel with the same sign, and sums to zero describes the facet directions and measures of a polytope. More, the shape of this polytope is uniquely determined by this information: every two polytopes that give rise to the same set of vectors are translations of each other.

== Blaschke sums ==
The sets of vectors representing two polytopes can be added by taking the union of the two sets and, when the two sets contain parallel vectors with the same sign, replacing them by their sum. The resulting operation on polytope shapes is called the Blaschke sum. It can be used to decompose arbitrary polytopes into simplices, and centrally symmetric polytopes into parallelotopes.

== Generalizations ==
With certain additional information (including separating the facet direction and size into a unit vector and a real number, which may be negative, providing an additional bit of information per facet) it is possible to generalize these existence and uniqueness results to certain classes of non-convex polyhedra.

It is also possible to specify three-dimensional polyhedra uniquely by the direction and perimeter of their facets. Minkowski's theorem and the uniqueness of this specification by direction and perimeter have a common generalization: whenever two three-dimensional convex polyhedra have the property that their facets have the same directions and no facet of one polyhedron can be translated into a proper subset of the facet with the same direction of the other polyhedron, the two polyhedra must be translates of each other. However, this version of the theorem does not generalize to higher dimensions.

== See also ==
- Alexandrov's uniqueness theorem
- Cauchy's theorem (geometry)
