= Truncated octahedron =

Archimedean solid with 14 faces

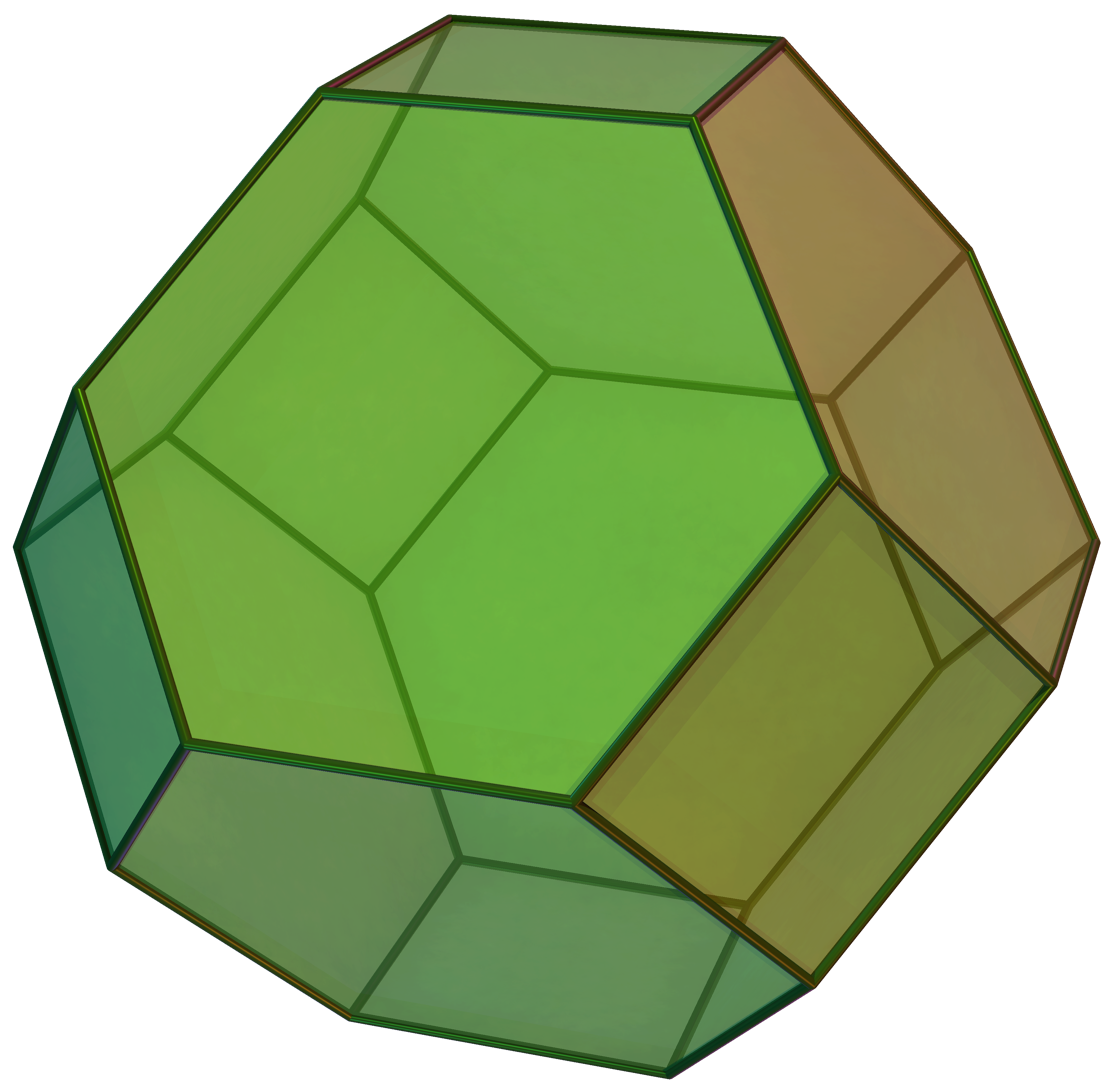
- Type: Archimedean solid, Parallelohedron, Permutohedron, Plesiohedron, Zonohedron
- Faces: 14
- Edges: 36
- Vertices: 24
- Symmetry group: octahedral symmetry $\mathrm{O}_\mathrm{h}$
- Dual polyhedron: tetrakis hexahedron

Vertex figure

Net

In geometry, the truncated octahedron is the Archimedean solid that arises from a regular octahedron by removing six equilateral square pyramids, one at each of the octahedron's vertices. It is also the cantitruncated form of a regular tetrahedron. The truncated octahedron has 14 faces (8 regular hexagons and 6 squares), 36 edges, and 24 vertices. Since each of its faces has point symmetry, the truncated octahedron is a 6-zonohedron. It is also the Goldberg polyhedron G_{IV}(1,1), containing square and hexagonal faces. Like the cube, it can tessellate (or "pack") 3-dimensional space, as a permutohedron.

The truncated octahedron is also known as the orthic tetrakaidecahedron. Buckminster Fuller called it the "mecon".

Its dual polyhedron is the tetrakis hexahedron. If the original truncated octahedron has unit edge length, then its dual tetrakis hexahedron has edge lengths 9/8√2 and 3/2√2.

== Construction ==
As suggested by its name, a truncated octahedron is constructed from a regular octahedron by cutting off all vertices. This resulting polyhedron has six squares and eight hexagons, leaving out six square pyramids. It can additionally be constructed by cantitruncating a regular tetrahedron.

Cantitruncation of a regular tetrahedron into a truncated octahedron. Half of the truncated octahedron's hexagonal faces come from the tetrahedron's triangular faces getting truncated, and half come from the degree-3 vertices getting cantitruncated.

The Cartesian coordinates of the vertices of a truncated octahedron with edge length 1 are all permutations of
$$\bigl(\pm\sqrt{2}, \pm\tfrac{\sqrt{2}}{2}, 0\bigr).$$
The truncated octahedron is the result of the regular octahedron's edges being expanded. The edges are separated and pushed away in the direction of two-fold rotational symmetry axes passing through the midpoint of opposite edges in the octahedral symmetry. With the distance between the closest parallel edges that is the regular octahedron's edge-length, connecting the endpoints of each edge to form hexagons and triangles, the highlight shows that the third Johnson solid, the triangular cupola, coincides with the hexagonal faces.

Loeb (1986) constructs a truncated octahedron by attaching eight cubes to each face. In this hinge, eight segments on each half-cube form hexagons, and the hexagons bisect the cubes. It thus can fold inward and outward, forming a truncated octahedron and a cube, respectively.

== Properties ==
Setting the edge length of the regular octahedron equal to $3a$, it follows that the length of each edge of a square pyramid (to be removed) is $a$ (the square pyramid has four equilateral triangles as faces, the first Johnson solid). The volume of each of these equilateral square pyramids is $\tfrac{\sqrt{2}}{6}a^3$. Because six of them are removed by truncation, the volume $V$ of the truncated octahedron is given by
$$V = \frac{\sqrt{2}}{3} (3a)^3 - 6 \cdot \frac{\sqrt{2}}{6} a^3 = 8\sqrt{2}a^3 \approx 11.3137 a^3.$$
The surface area $A$ of this truncated octahedron can be obtained by summing all polygons' area, six squares and eight hexagons:
$$A = (6 + 12\sqrt{3})a^2 \approx 26.7846a^2.$$

3D model of a truncated octahedron

The truncated octahedron is one of the thirteen Archimedean solids. In other words, it is a highly symmetric, semi-regular polyhedron with two or more different regular polygonal faces meeting at a vertex. The dual polyhedron of a truncated octahedron is the tetrakis hexahedron. They both have the same three-dimensional symmetry group as the regular octahedron does, the octahedral symmetry $\mathrm{O}_\mathrm{h}$. Each vertex is surrounded by a square and two hexagons, so its vertex figure is $4 \cdot 6^2$.

A truncated octahedron has two different dihedral angles, angles between two polygonal faces. The angle between square and hexagonal faces is $\arccos(-1/\sqrt{3}) \approx 125.26^\circ$, and the angle between two adjacent hexagonal faces is $\arccos (-1/3) \approx 109.47^\circ$.

== Other classifications ==
=== As a permutohedron ===
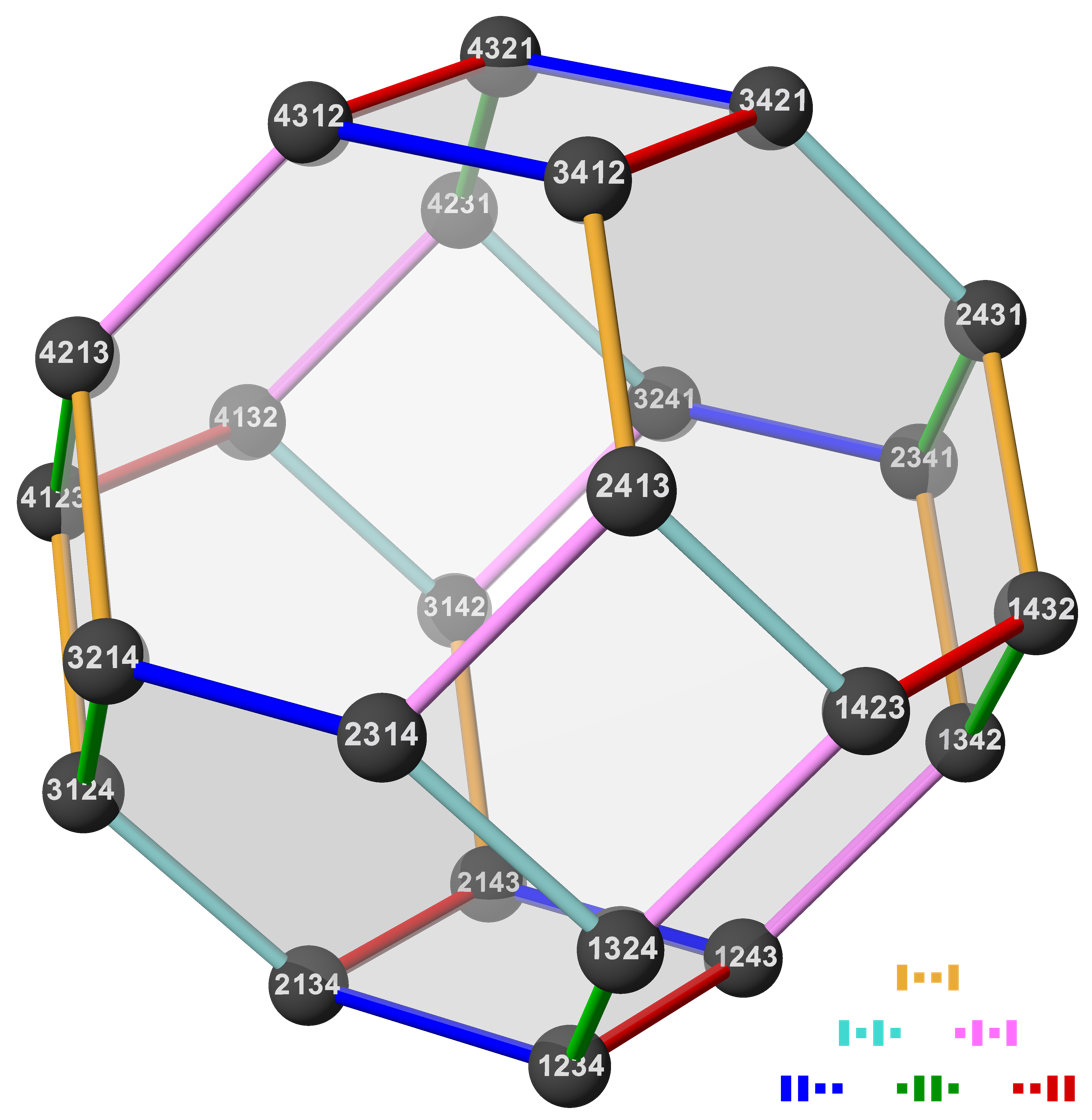
Truncated octahedron as a permutahedron of order 4

The truncated octahedron can be described as a permutohedron of order 4, or 4-permutohedron, meaning it can be represented with even more symmetric coordinates in four dimensions: all permutations of $(1, 2, 3, 4)$ form the vertices of a truncated octahedron in the three-dimensional subspace $x + y + z + w = 10$. Therefore, each vertex corresponds to a permutation of $(1, 2, 3, 4)$ and each edge represents a single pairwise swap of two elements. With this labeling, the swaps are of elements whose values differ by one. If, instead, the truncated octahedron is labeled by the inverse permutations, then the edges correspond to swaps of elements whose positions differ by one. With this alternative labeling, the edges and vertices of the truncated octahedron form the Cayley graph of the symmetric group $S_4$, the group of four-element permutations, as generated by swaps of consecutive positions.

=== As a space-filling polyhedron ===
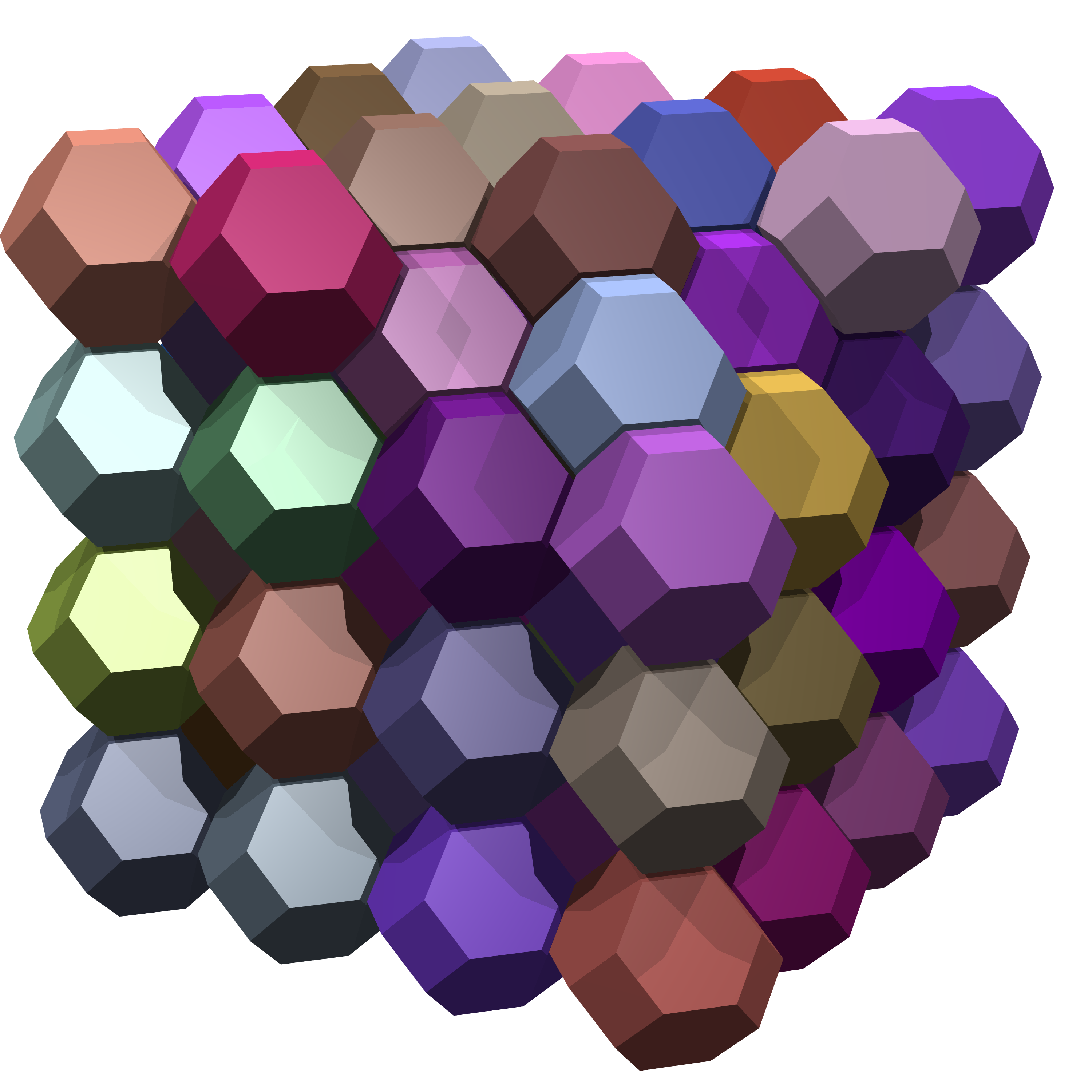
Truncated octahedra tiling space

The truncated octahedron is a space-filling polyhedron; that is, it can tile space by translating its copies face-to-face in order to form a honeycomb. It is classified as plesiohedron, meaning it can be defined as the Voronoi cell of a symmetric Delone set. Plesiohedra, translated without rotating, can be repeated to fill space. The truncated octahedron is one of the five three-dimensional primary parallelohedra; the other four are the cube, the hexagonal prism, the rhombic dodecahedron, and the elongated dodecahedron. The truncated octahedron is generated from six line segments with four triples of coplanar segments. In the most symmetric form, it is generated from six line segments parallel to the face diagonals of a cube. The truncated octahedron tile a honeycomb known as a bitruncated cubic honeycomb. More generally, every permutohedron and parallelohedron is a zonohedron, a polyhedron that is centrally symmetric and can be defined by a Minkowski sum.

== Appearances ==
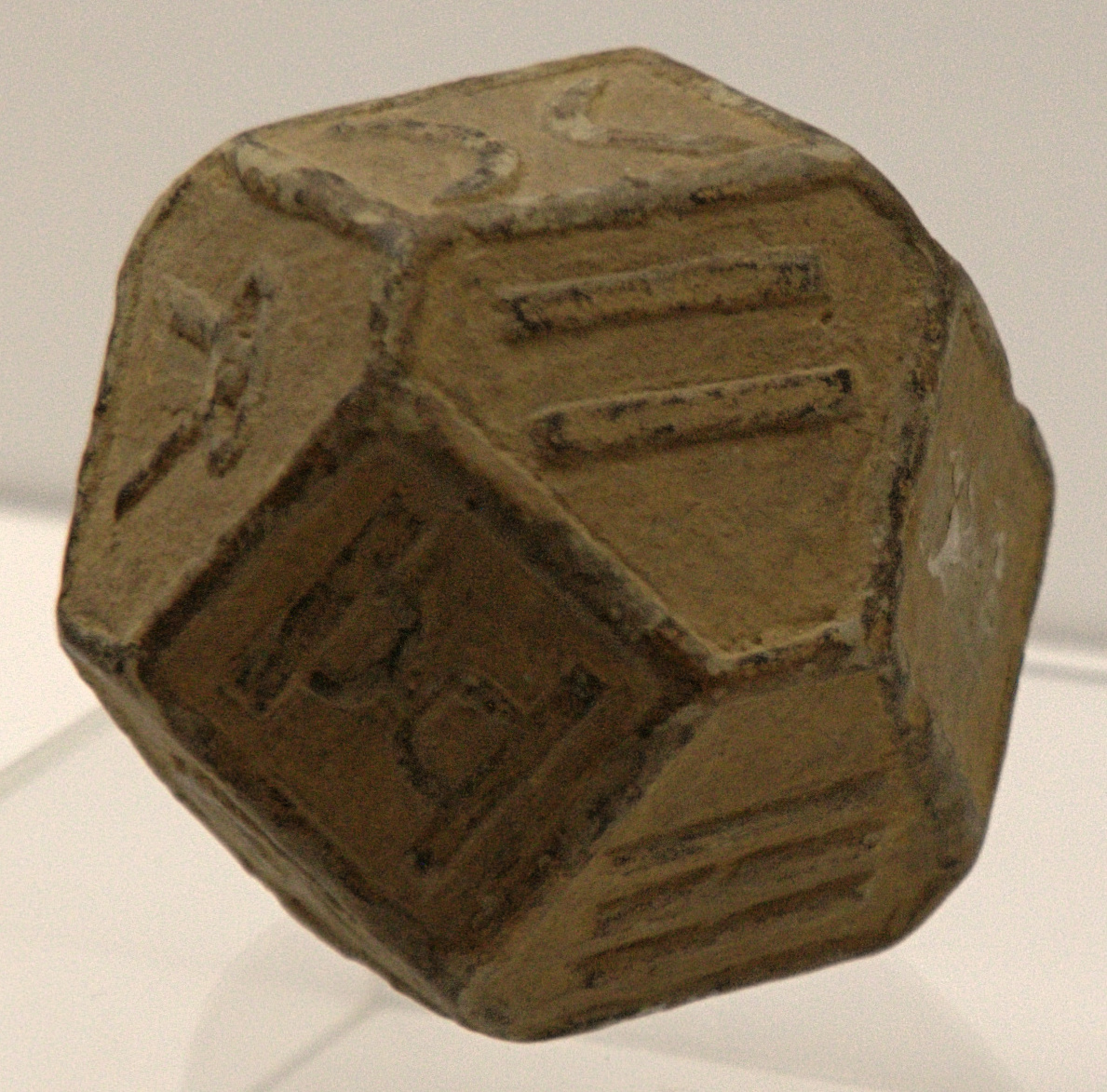
Fourteen-sided Chinese dice

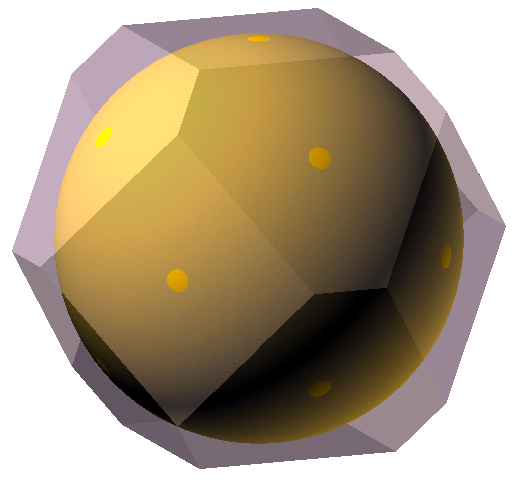
Similar shape, octahedron truncated down to the inscribed sphere

The first Brillouin zone of the FCC lattice, showing symmetry labels for high symmetry lines and points.

The structure of the faujasite framework

The truncated octahedron has been used as a fourteen-sided die, dating back to China in Warring States period, although a cube was also used as well.

The truncated octahedron appears in the structure in the framework of a faujasite-type of zeolite crystals. The structure consists of sodalite cages that resemble truncated octahedra, connecting each other by hexagonal prisms

In solid-state physics, the first Brillouin zone of the face-centered cubic lattice is a truncated octahedron.

The shape of a truncated octahedron appears as the Wigner–Seitz cell of a sodium. The background for this discovery dates back to Eugene Wigner and Frederick Seitz's proposal on the Wigner–Seitz cell's application to condensed matter physics on solving the Schrödinger equation for free electrons in sodium.

The truncated octahedron (in fact, the generalized truncated octahedron) appears in the error analysis of quantization index modulation (QIM) in conjunction with repetition coding.

== Related polyhedra ==
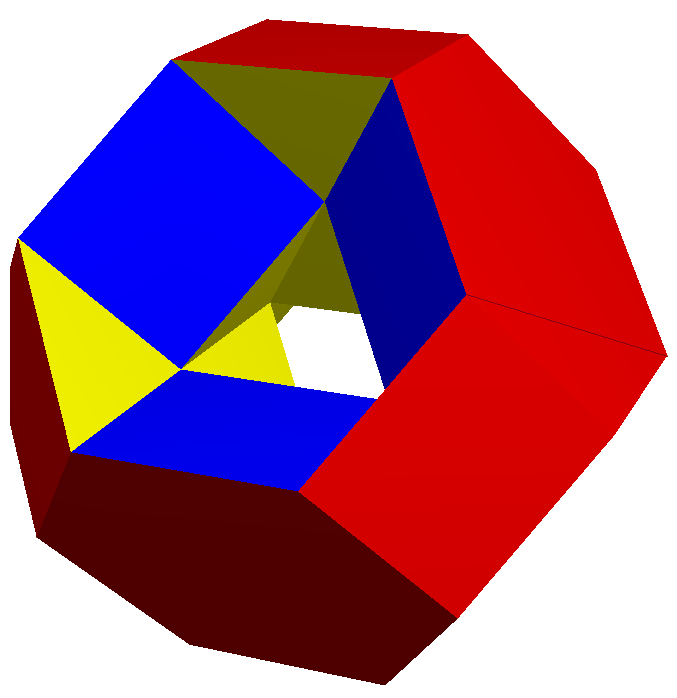
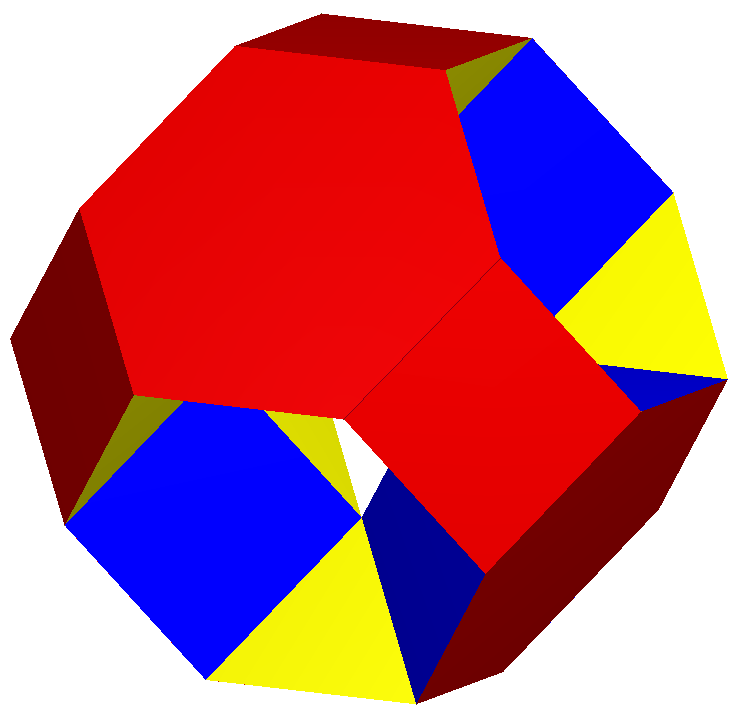
Second and third genus toroids

The truncated octahedron can be dissected into a central octahedron, surrounded by 8 triangular cupolae on each face, and 6 square pyramids above the vertices. Removing the central octahedron and 2 or 4 triangular cupolae creates two Stewart toroids, with dihedral and tetrahedral symmetry.

It is possible to slice a tesseract by a hyperplane so that its sliced cross-section is a truncated octahedron.

The cell-transitive bitruncated cubic honeycomb can also be seen as the Voronoi tessellation of the body-centered cubic lattice. The truncated octahedron is one of five three-dimensional primary parallelohedra.

== Objects ==
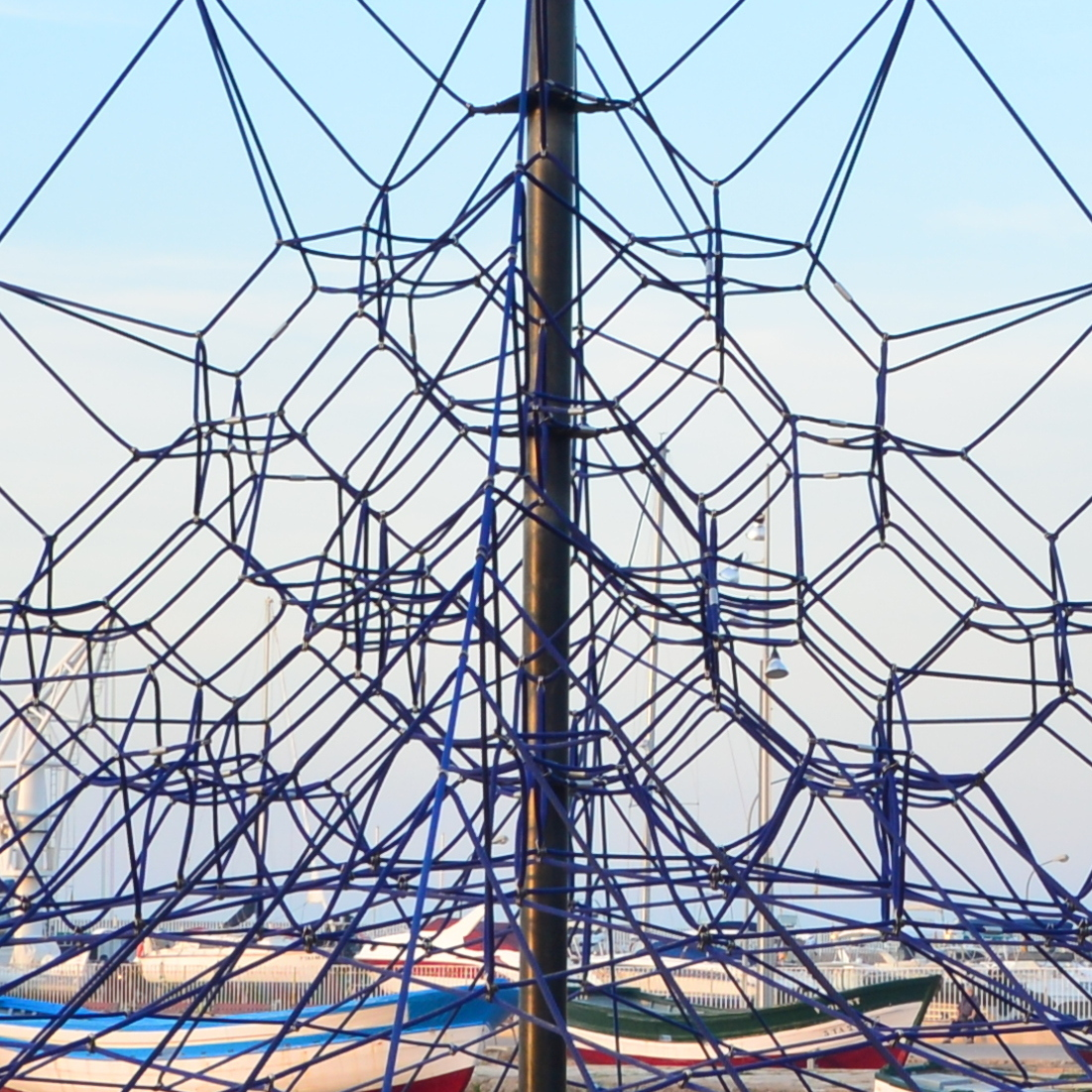
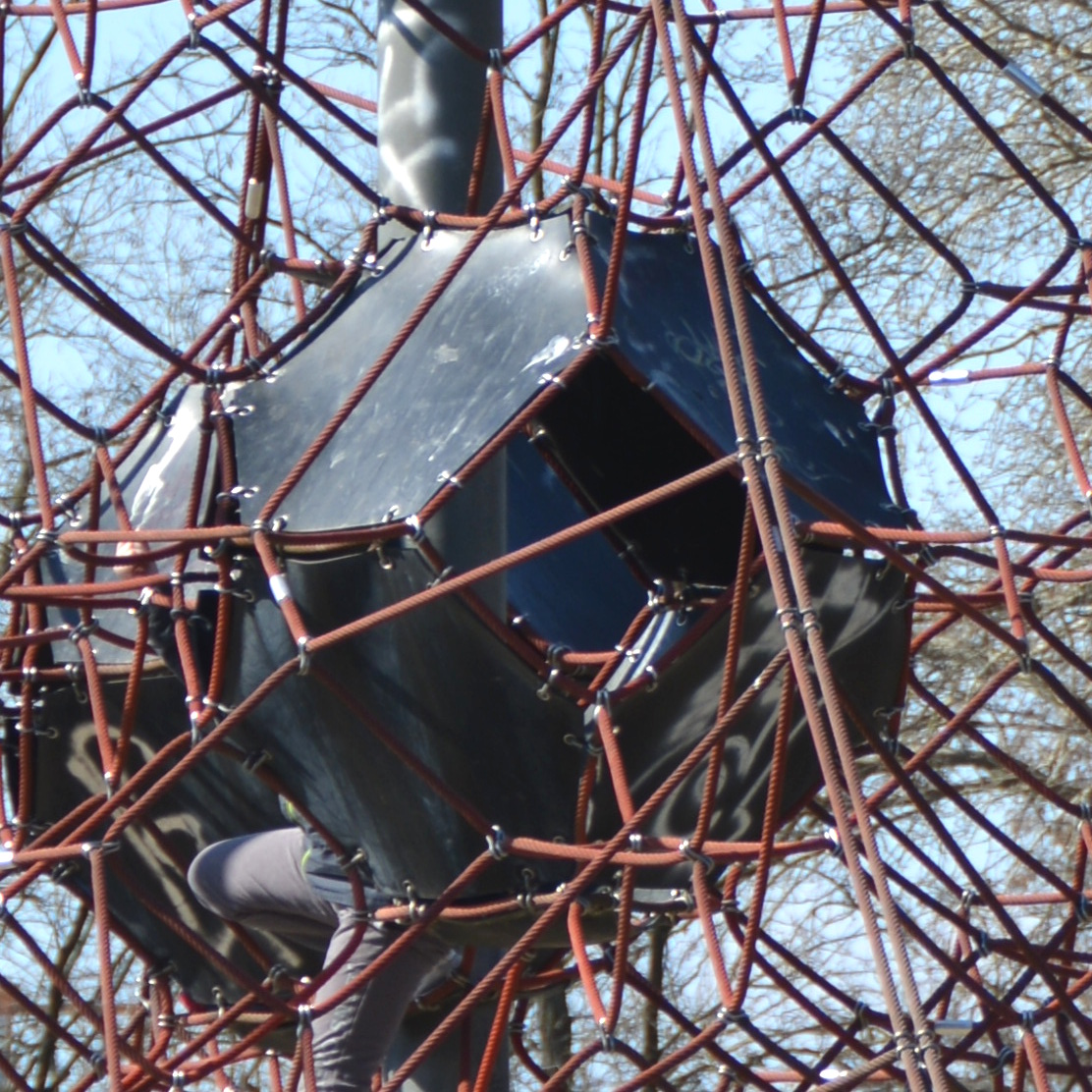
Jungle gym nets often include truncated octahedra.
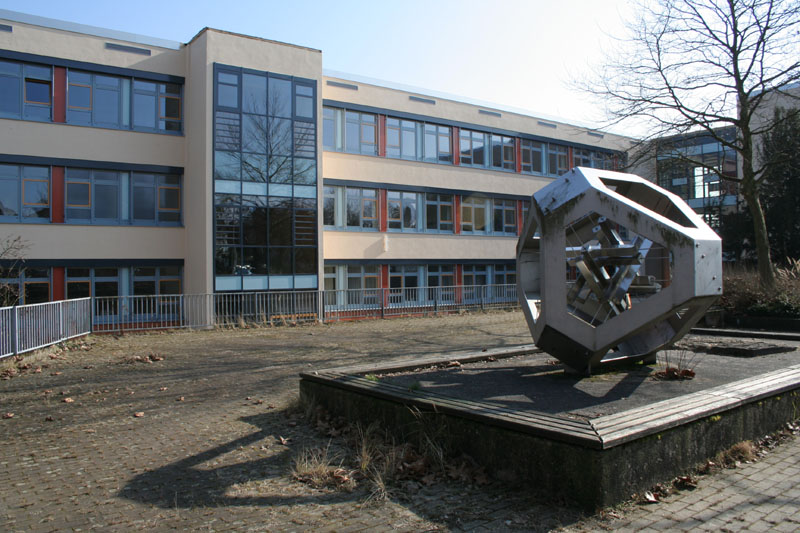
sculpture in Bonn

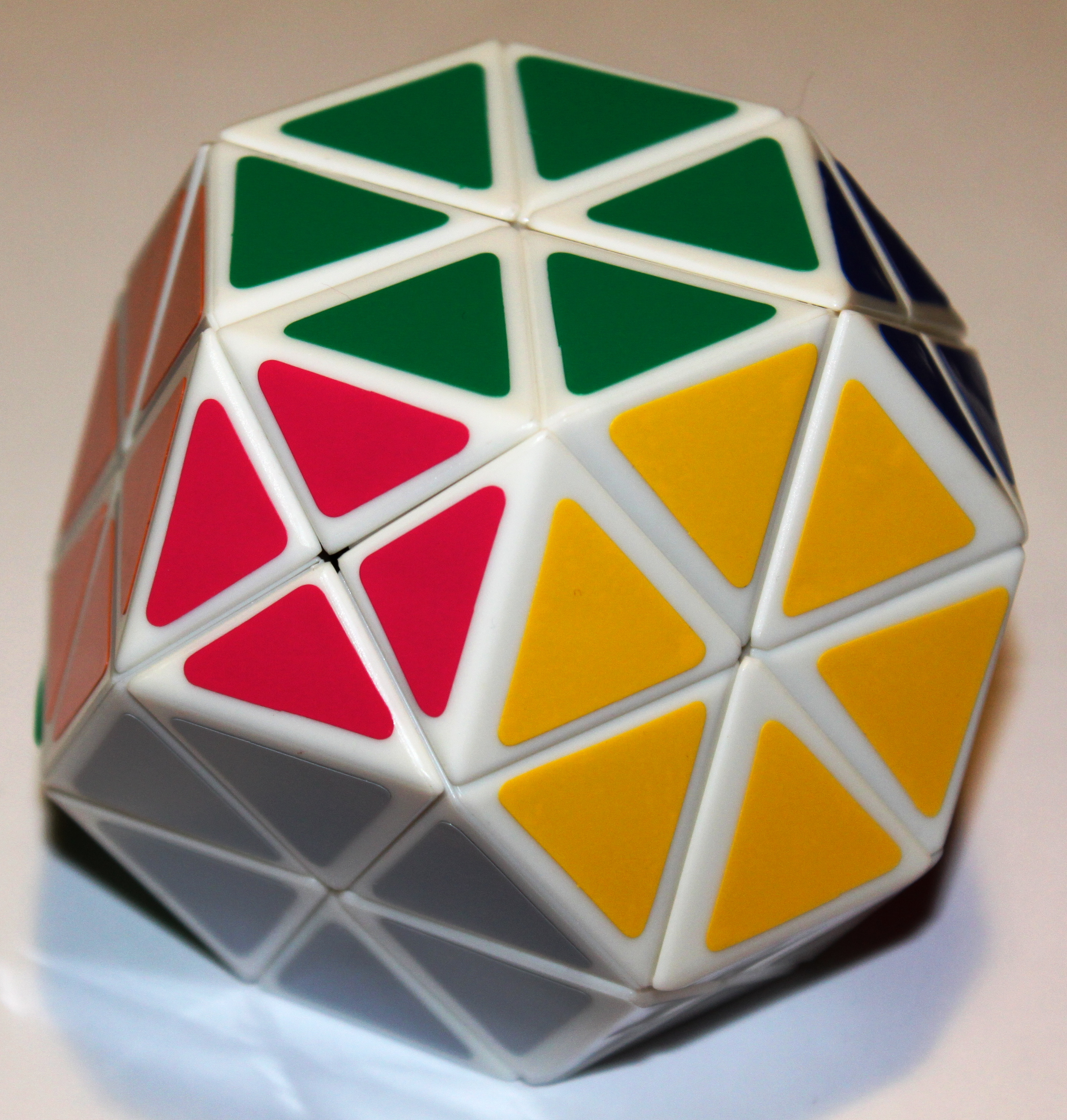
Rubik's Cube variant

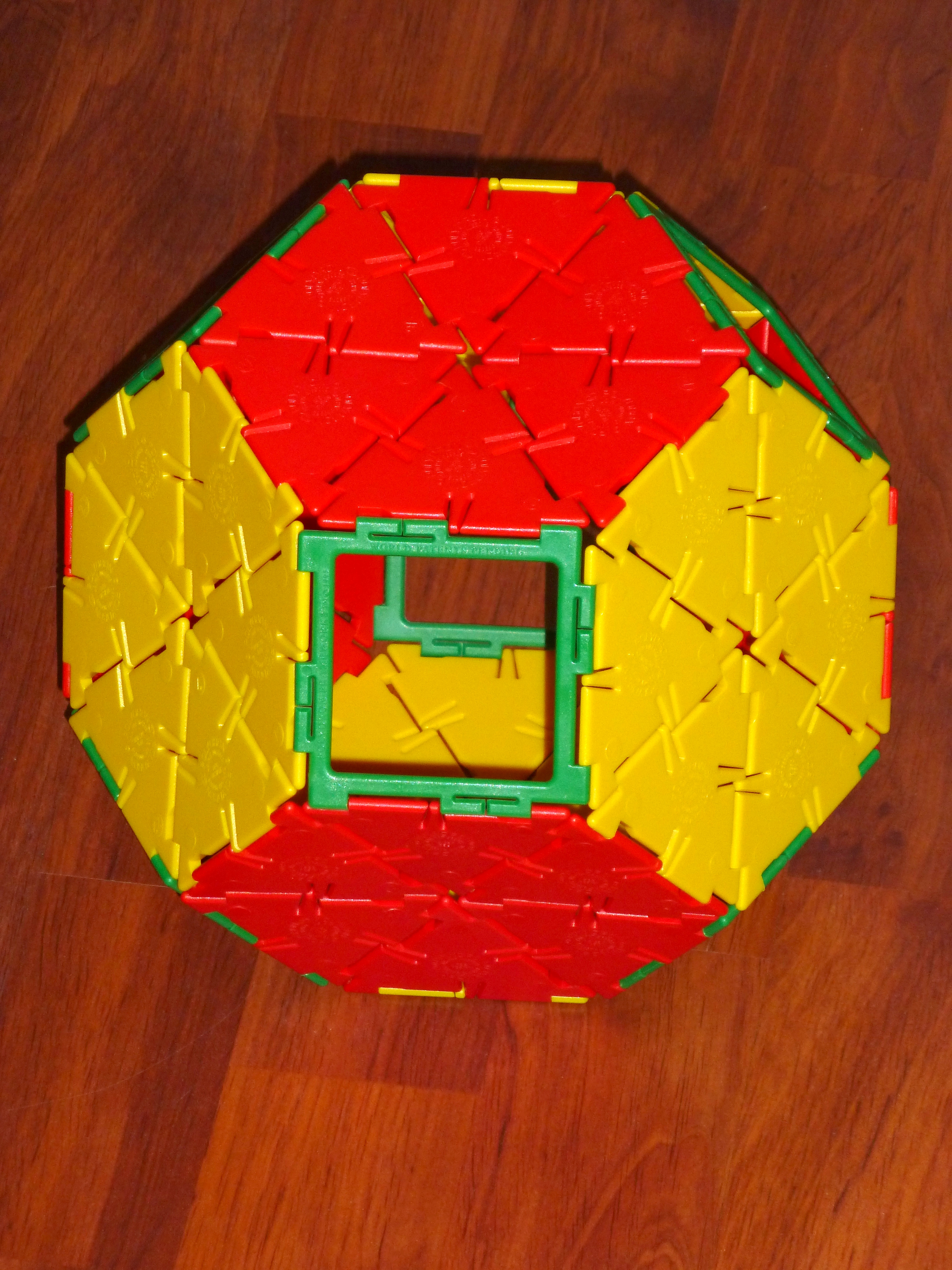
model made with Polydron construction set

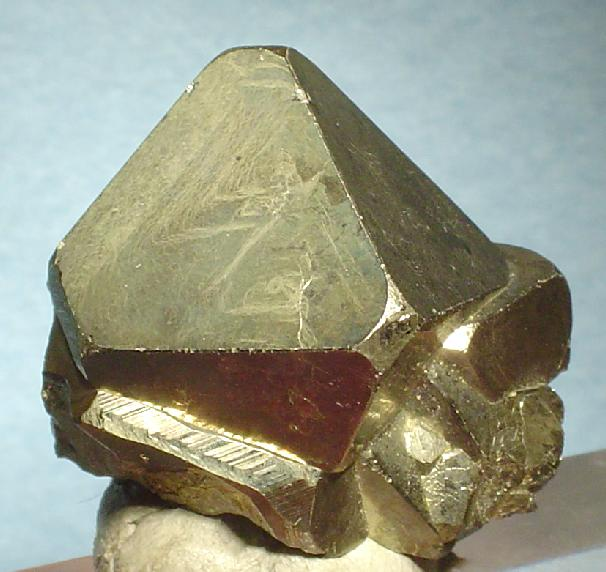
Pyrite crystal

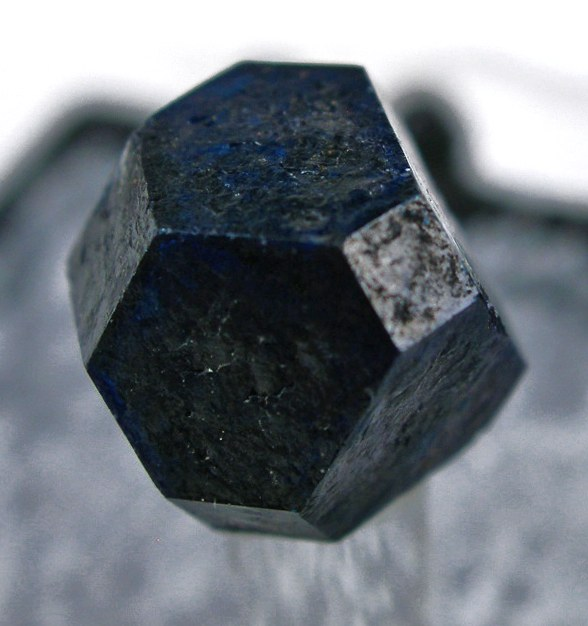
Boleite crystal

== Truncated octahedral graph ==
Truncated octahedral graph
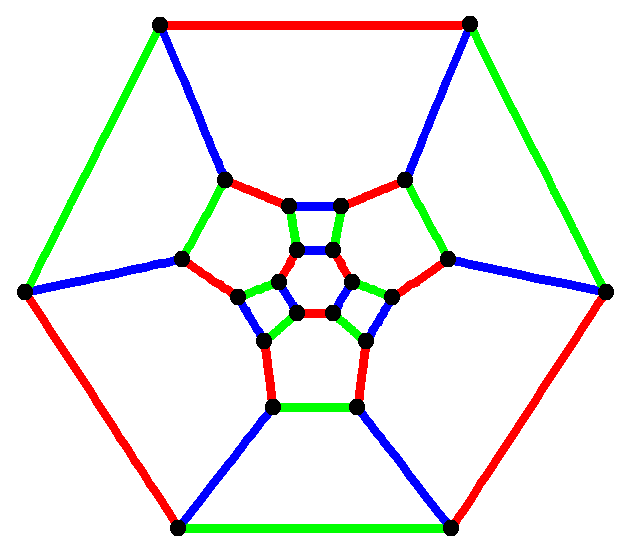
- 3-fold symmetric Schlegel diagram
- Vertices: 24
- Edges: 36
- Automorphisms: 48
- Chromatic number: 2
- Book thickness: 3
- Queue number: 2
- Properties: Cubic, Hamiltonian, regular, zero-symmetric

In the mathematical field of graph theory, a truncated octahedral graph is the graph of vertices and edges of the truncated octahedron. It has 24 vertices and 36 edges, and is a cubic Archimedean graph. It has book thickness 3 and queue number 2.

As a Hamiltonian cubic graph, it can be represented by LCF notation in multiple ways: [3, −7, 7, −3]^{6}, [5, −11, 11, 7, 5, −5, −7, −11, 11, −5, −7, 7]^{2}, and [−11, 5, −3, −7, −9, 3, −5, 5, −3, 9, 7, 3, −5, 11, −3, 7, 5, −7, −9, 9, 7, −5, −7, 3].

Three different Hamiltonian cycles described by the three different LCF notations for the truncated octahedral graph

LCF [3, −7, 7, −3]^{6}
LCF [5, −7, 7, −5]^{6}
Configuration

\	v_{1}	v_{2}	e_{1}	e_{2}	e_{3}
v_{1}	12	*	1	0	2
v_{2}	*	12	1	2	0
e_{1}	1	1	12	*	*
e_{2}	0	2	*	12	*
e_{3}	2	0	*	*	12

== See also ==
- DNA nanotechnology
- Skew apeirohedron
