= Ten-of-diamonds decahedron =

Space-filling polyhedron

Ten-of-diamonds
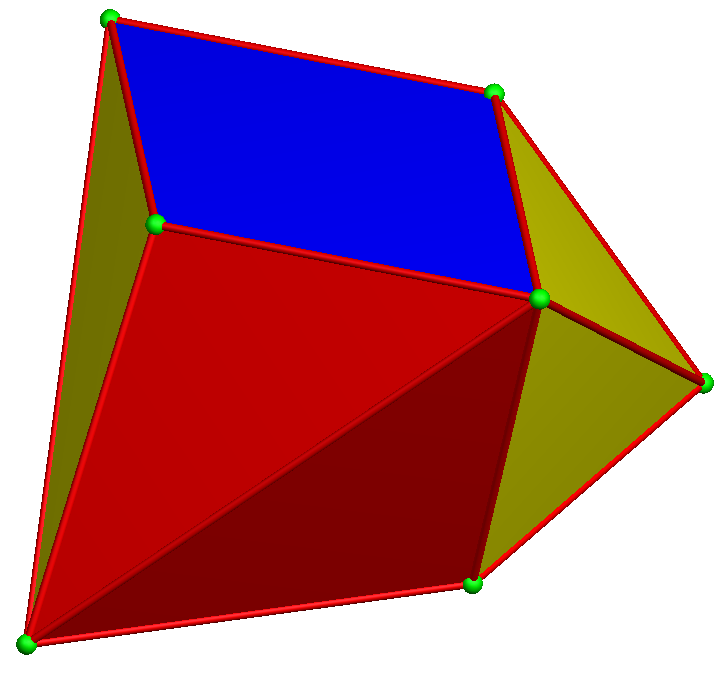
- Faces: 8 triangles 2 rhombi
- Edges: 16
- Vertices: 8
- Properties: space-filling

In geometry, the ten-of-diamonds decahedron is a space-filling polyhedron with 10 faces, 2 opposite rhombi with orthogonal major axes, connected by 8 identical isosceles triangle faces. Michael Goldberg named it after a playing card, as a 10-faced polyhedron with two opposite rhombic (diamond-shaped) faces. He catalogued it in a 1982 paper as 10-II, the second in a list of 26 known space-filling decahedra.

== Related polyhedra ==
The ten-of-diamonds can be dissected in an octagonal cross-section between the two rhombic faces. It is a decahedron with 12 vertices, 20 edges, and 10 faces (4 triangles, 4 trapezoids, 1 rhombus, and 1 isotoxal octagon). Michael Goldberg labels this polyhedron 10-XXV, the 25th in a list of space-filling decahedra.

The ten-of-diamonds can be dissected as a half-model on a symmetry plane into a space-filling heptahedron with 6 vertices, 11 edges, and 7 faces (6 triangles and 1 trapezoid). Michael Goldberg identifies this polyhedron as a "triply truncated quadrilateral prism", type 7-XXIV, the 24th in a list of space-filling heptahedra.

It can be further dissected as a quarter-model by another symmetry plane into a space-filling hexahedron with 6 vertices, 10 edges, and 6 faces (4 triangles, 2 right trapezoids). Michael Goldberg identifies this polyhedron as an "ungulated quadrilateral pyramid", type 6-X, the 10th in a list of space-filling hexahedra.

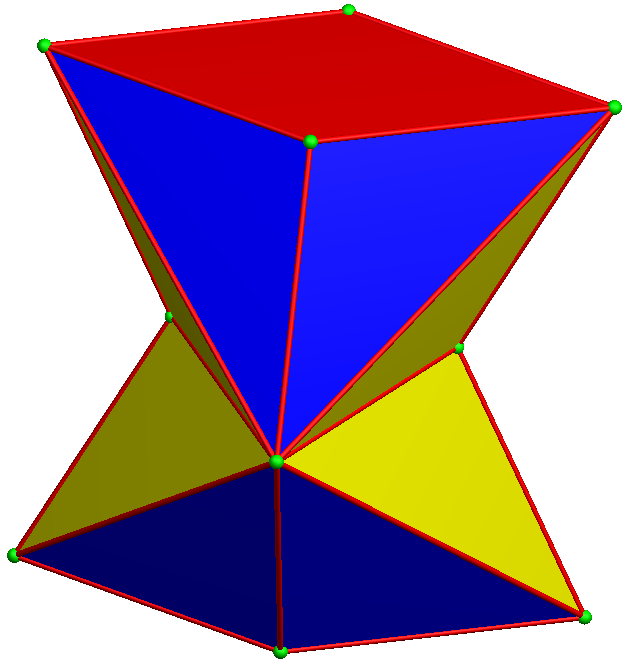
Rhombic bowtie

Pairs of ten-of-diamonds can be attached as a nonconvex bow-tie space-filler, called a rhombic bowtie for its cross-sectional appearance. The two right-most symmetric projections below show the rhombi edge-on on the top, bottom and a middle neck where the two halves are connected. It has 12 vertices, 28 edges, and 18 faces (16 triangles and 2 rhombi) within D_{2h} symmetry. These paired-cells stack more easily as inter-locking elements. Long sequences of these can be stacked together in 3 axes to fill space.

== See also ==
- Elongated gyrobifastigium
