= Boris Delaunay =

Soviet mathematician

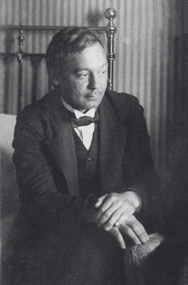
- Born: Boris Nikolayevich Delaunay; 15 March 1890; Saint Petersburg, Russian Empire
- Died: 17 July 1980 (aged 90); Moscow, Soviet Union
- Known for: Delaunay triangulation, Mountain climbing
- Scientific career
- Doctoral advisor: Dmitry Grave; Georgy Voronoy
- Doctoral students: Aleksandr Danilovich Aleksandrov; Nikolay Petrovich Dolbilin; Igor Shafarevich; Isaak Yaglom
- Boris Delaunay's voice Recorded 14 December 1973

Boris Nikolayevich Delaunay or Delone (Note: The spelling Delone is a straightforward transliteration from Cyrillic he often used in later publications, while Delaunay is the French version he used in the early French and German publications.) (French pronunciation: [dəlonɛ], Russian: Бори́с Никола́евич Делоне́; 15 March 1890 – 17 July 1980) was a Soviet and Russian mathematician, mountain climber, and the father of physicist, Nikolai Borisovich Delone. He is best known for the Delaunay triangulation.

== Biography ==
Boris Delone got his surname from his ancestor French Army officer de Launay, who was captured in Russia during Napoleon's invasion of 1812. De Launay was a nephew of the Bastille governor marquis de Launay. He married a woman from the noble Tukhachevsky family and stayed in Russia.

When Boris was a young boy his family spent summers in the Alps where he learned mountain climbing. By 1913, he became one of the top three Russian mountain climbers. After the Russian Revolution, he climbed mountains in the Caucasus and Altai. One of the mountains (4300 m) near Belukha is named after him. In the 1930s, he was among the first to receive a qualification of Master of mountain climbing of the USSR. Future Nobel laureate in physics Igor Tamm was his associate in setting tourist camps in the mountains.

Boris Delaunay worked in the fields of modern algebra, the geometry of numbers. He used the results of Evgraf Fedorov, Hermann Minkowski, Georgy Voronoy, and others in his development of modern mathematical crystallography and general mathematical model of crystals. He invented what is now called Delaunay triangulation in 1934; Delone sets are also named after him. Among his best students are the mathematicians Aleksandr Aleksandrov and Igor Shafarevich.

Delaunay was elected the corresponding member of the Academy of Sciences of the Soviet Union in 1929. Delaunay is credited as being an organizer, in Leningrad in 1934, of the first mathematical olympiad for high school students in the Soviet Union.

== Selected publications ==
Books

- Delone, B. N.; Raikov, D. A. (1948, 1949). Analytic Geometry (2 vols.). State Technical Press. (in Russian)
- Kolmogorov, Andrey Nikolaevich et al. (1969). Mathematics: Its Content, Methods and Meaning, chapter Analytic Geometry, by B. N. Delone. MIT Press. (translated from the Russian)

Oral history

- О том, как спасся от расстрела, устроил сталинскую премию за 5 кг мясного жира и основал советский альпинизм ("How [I] escaped execution, arranged a Stalin prize for 5 kg of salo and founded Soviet mountaineering")
