= Elongated dodecahedron =

Polyhedron with 8 rhombic and 4 hexagonal faces

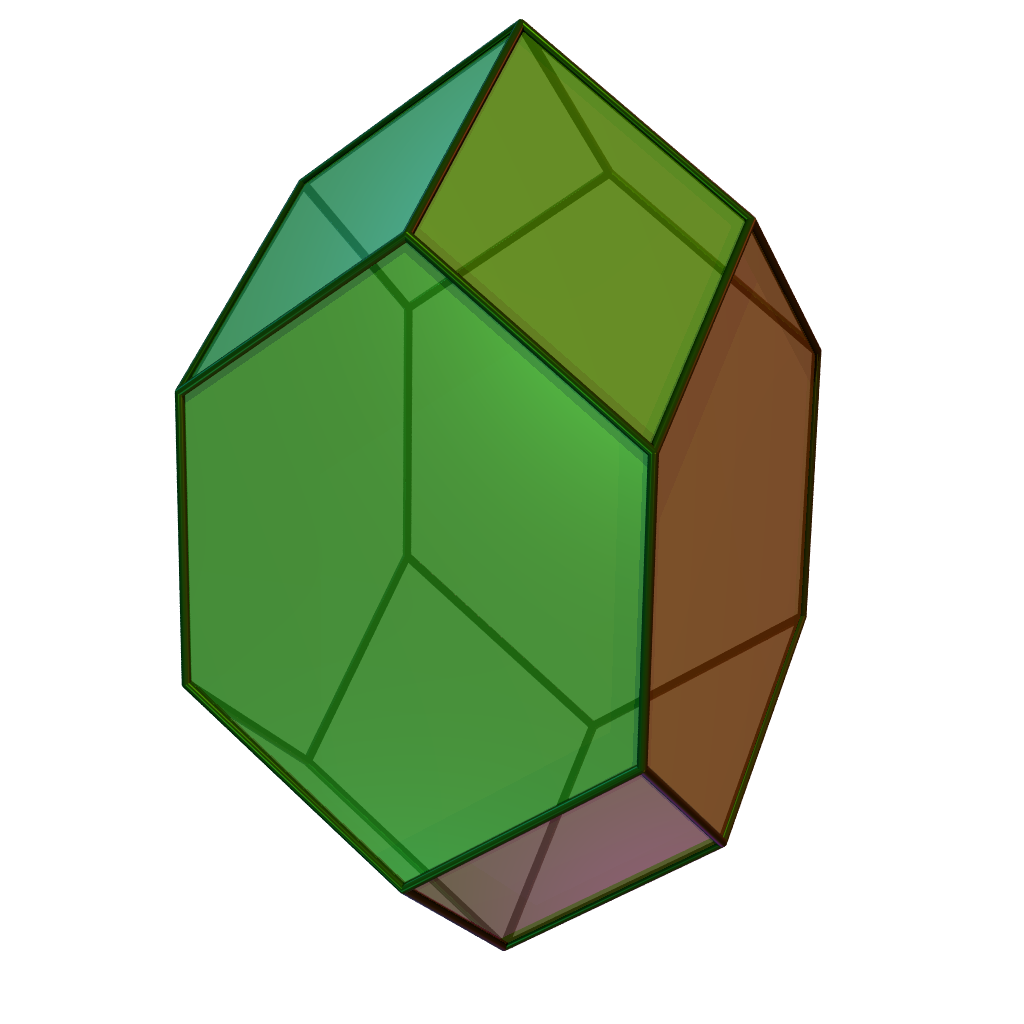
- Type: Parallelohedron
- Faces: 8 rhombi 4 hexagons
- Edges: 28
- Vertices: 18
- Properties: Convex

Net
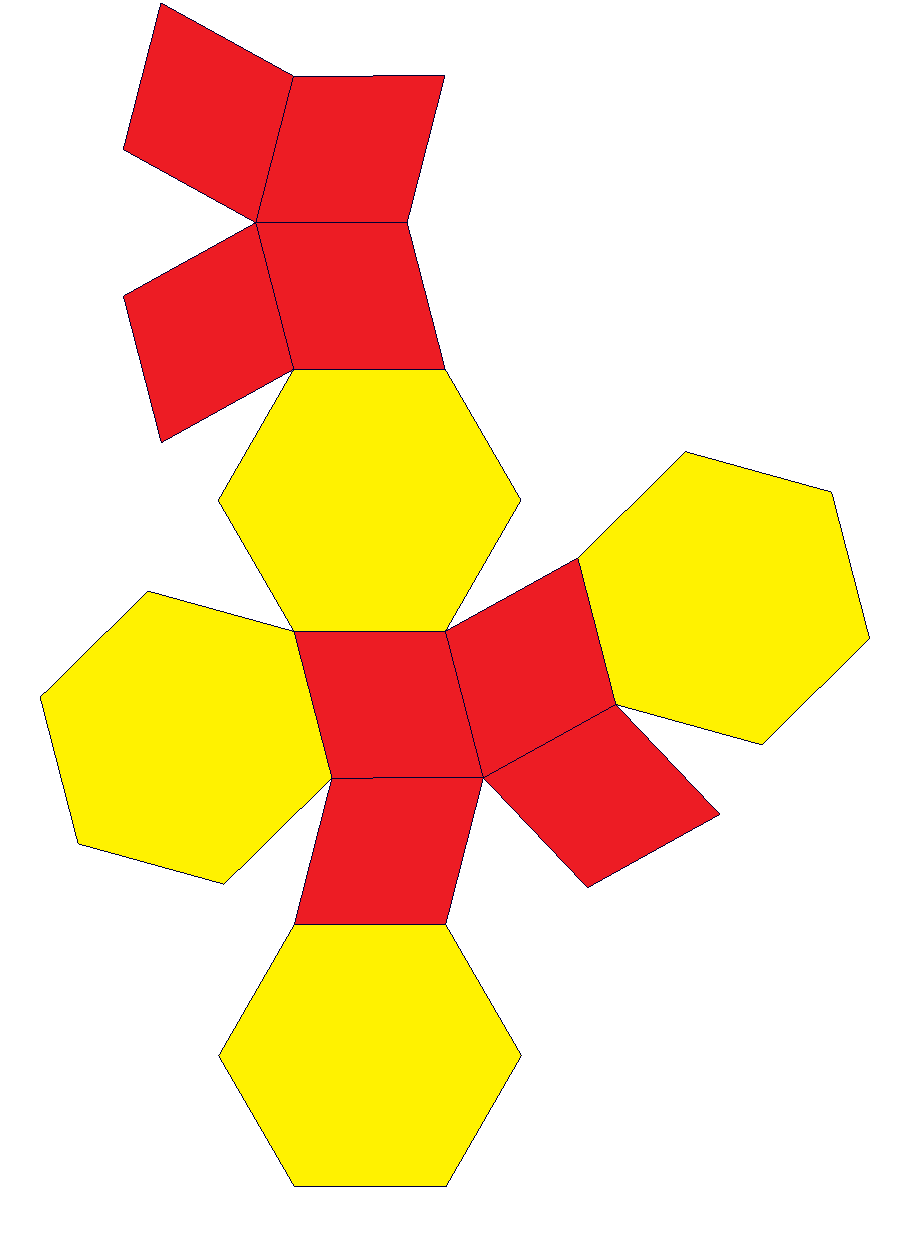

3D model of an elongated dodecahedron

In geometry, the elongated dodecahedron, elongated rhombic dodecahedron, extended rhombic dodecahedron, rhombo-hexagonal dodecahedron or hexarhombic dodecahedron is a convex dodecahedron with eight rhombic and four hexagonal faces.

== Properties ==
Given that $a$ is the edge length of an elongated dodecahedron. One can calculate its surface area $A$ and volume $V$ in the formulas below:
$$\begin{align}
A &= 2\left(3\sqrt{3}+\sqrt{15}\right)a^2 \approx 18.14a^2\\
V &= 6a^3\\
\end{align}$$

== Parallelohedron ==
The elongated dodecahedron can be constructed by elongating a rhombic dodecahedron – i.e., slicing it into two congruent concave polyhedra and covering the bases of a square prism. As a result, it has eighteen vertices, twenty-eight edges, and twelve faces (which include eight rhombi and four hexagons).

Both the rhombic dodecahedron and the elongated dodecahedron are two of the five types of parallelohedron identified by Evgraf Fedorov. In other words, it is a space-filling polyhedron, meaning the elongated dodecahedron and its copy can tile space face-to-face by translations periodically. For the elongated dodecahedron, it has five sets of parallel edges called zones or belts. This produces an elongated dodecahedral honeycomb. It is the Wigner–Seitz cell for certain body-centered tetragonal lattices.

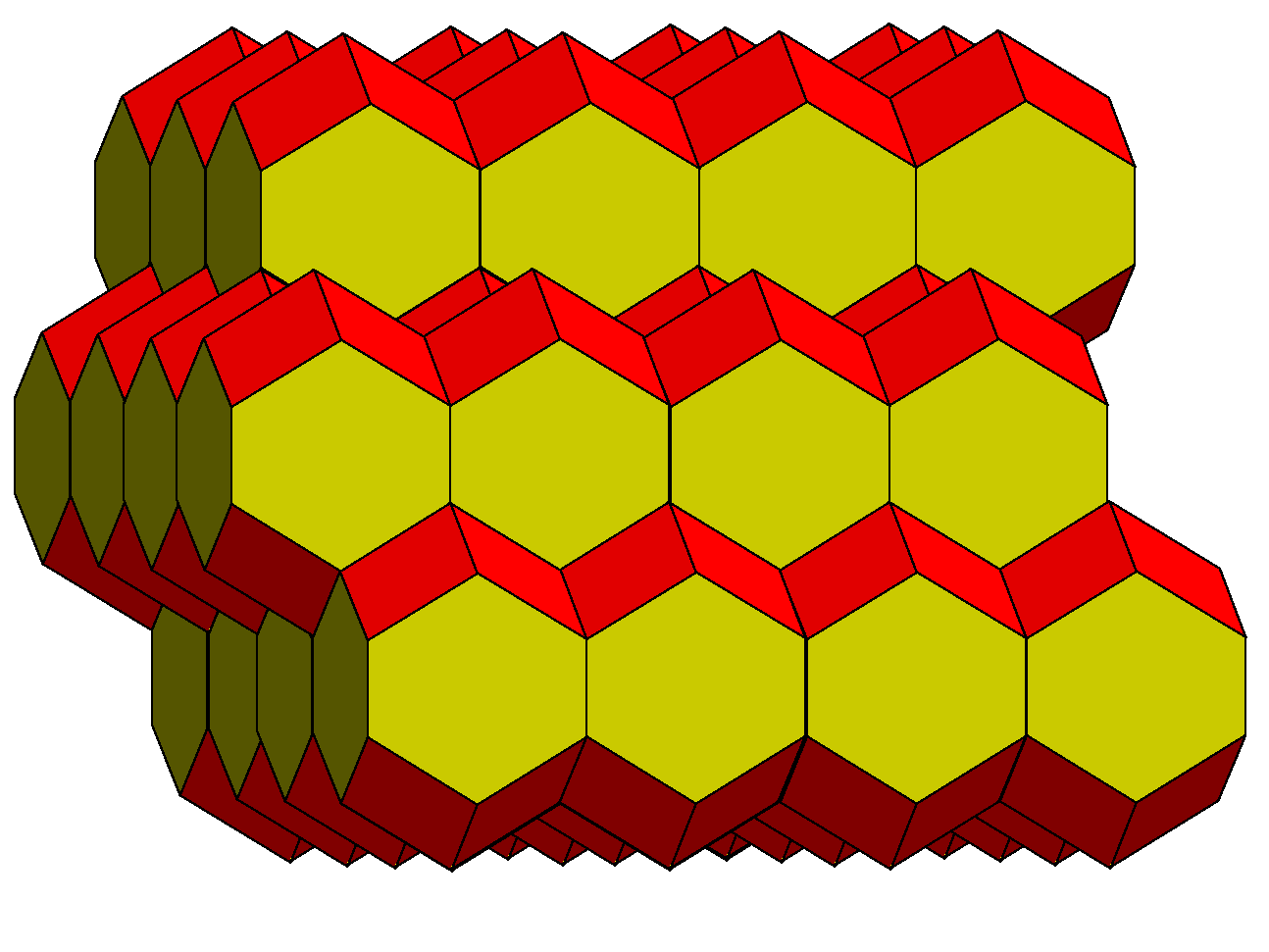
Elongated dodecahedral honeycomb

This is related to the rhombic dodecahedral honeycomb with an elongation of zero. Projected normal to the elongation direction, the honeycomb looks like a square tiling with the rhombi projected into squares.

== Variations ==
The expanded dodecahedra can be distorted into cubic volumes, with the honeycomb as a half-offset stacking of cubes. It can also be made concave by adjusting the 8 corners downward by the same amount as the centers are moved up.

| Coplanar polyhedron | Net | Honeycomb |
| Concave | Net | Honeycomb |

The elongated dodecahedron can be constructed as a contraction of a uniform truncated octahedron, where square faces are reduced to single edges and regular hexagonal faces are reduced to 60-degree rhombic faces (or pairs of equilateral triangles). This construction alternates square and rhombi on the 4-valence vertices, and has half the symmetry, D_{2h} symmetry, order 8.

| Contracted truncated octahedron | Net | Honeycomb |

== See also ==
- Trapezo-rhombic dodecahedron, a space-filling polyhedron with six rhombi and six trapezohedral faces
- Elongated gyrobifastigium, a space-filling polyhedron with four quadrilaterals and four pentagonal faces.
