= Hexagonal prism =

Prism with a 6-sided base

Hexagon prism
- Type: prism, parallelohedron stereohedron zonohedron
- Symmetry group: prismatic symmetry $D_{6\mathrm{h}}$ of order 24
- Dual polyhedron: hexagonal bipyramid

3D model of a uniform hexagonal prism

The hexagonal prism is a prism with eight faces, eighteen edges, and twelve vertices. The eight faces are two hexagons as the bases of the prism and six parallelograms connecting the sides of bases. When the faces become regular polygons, the hexagonal prism is uniform. The uniform hexagonal prism is a composite polyhedron and can be used to construct polyhedra. The dual of a hexagonal prism is a hexagonal bipyramid.

The hexagonal prism is a parallelohedron that can attached to its copy without translation and rotation to produce a hexagonal prismatic honeycomb. As a parallelohedron, the hexagonal prism is a zonohedron and also a stereohedron.

The applications of a hexagonal prism are the satellite bus of a NASA space probe Juno, and the zeolites mineral structure.

== Properties ==
A hexagonal prism has twelve vertices, eighteen edges, and eight faces. Every prism has two faces known as its bases, which are hexagonal shapes. A hexagon has six vertices, each of which pairs with another hexagon's vertex, forming six edges. These edges form three parallelograms as other faces. The hexagonal prism is therefore has six vertices, eighteen edges, and eight faces.

A prism is said to be right if the edges are of the same length and perpendicular to the base. If its faces are all regular polygons, the hexagonal prism is a semiregular polyhedron—more generally, a uniform polyhedron. The uniform hexagonal prism is vertex-transitive: any two vertices are mapping to each other under the symmetry. It has two dihedral angles, angles that are formed by two adjacent faces. The angle between two adjacent squares is the same as the internal angle of a regular hexagon, 120°. The angle between the base and a square face is a right angle. It is an elementary polyhedron: cannot be sliced by a plane to have any convex, regular-faced polyhedra. When the prism is attached to other elementaries, the resulting polyhedra become composites. Several composites are the augmented hexagonal prism, metabiaugmented hexagonal prism, parabiaugmented hexagonal prism, and triaugmented hexagonal prism.

The symmetry group of a hexagonal prism is prismatic symmetry $D_{6 \mathrm{h}}$ of order 24: a six-fold axis of rotation passes through the bases' centroid, three two-fold axes perpendicularly pass through two opposite square faces, three vertical reflection planes pass through two opposite vertices of the base, and one horizontal reflection plane pass through square faces of the central prism. The dual polyhedron of any prism is generally a bipyramid, obtained by joining two pyramids base-to-base. In the case of a hexagonal prism, its dual is a hexagonal bipyramid by two hexagonal pyramids. Both have the same three-dimensional symmetry group.

The volume of a prism in general is formulated as the product of the base's with edge length $a$ and the height $h$. For a hexagonal prism, it is
$$V = \frac{3 \sqrt{3}}{2}a^2h.$$

== Parallelohedron ==
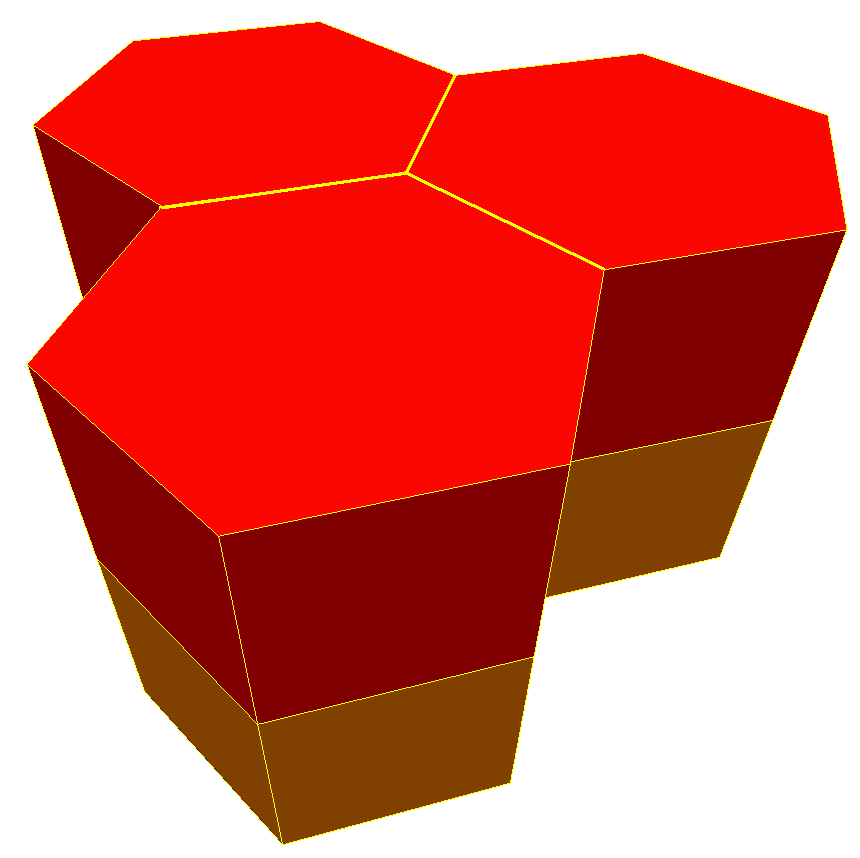
Hexagonal prismatic honeycomb

The hexagonal prism is one of the five parallelohedra, a set of polyhedra where the copy can be translated without rotations in the Euclidean space, attaching to each other face-to-face periodically to produce the honeycombs. The parallelohedra was discovered by Russian crystallographer Evgraf Fedorov in accordance with his studies of crystallography systems. The hexagonal prism is generated from four line segments, three of them parallel to a common plane and the fourth not. Its most symmetric form is the right prism over a regular hexagon, forming the hexagonal prismatic honeycomb.

The parallelohedra, including the hexagonal prism, have central symmetry and centrally symmetric faces. Polyhedra with such a properties are the zonohedra, and every parallelohedron is a zonohedron. Every parallelohedron is a stereohedron, where any convex polyhedron tiles space to any other tile under the given symmetry.

== Applications ==
The hexagonal prism is used by Juno, NASA space probe with the mission to explore the planet Jupiter and measure the planet's composition. The spacecraft Juno used the hexagonal prism model as a satellite bus, the main body of a spacecraft connecting three large solar panels.

The hexagonal prism is a building block constructing the structure of the zeolites mineral. One example of the zeolite is a faujasite-type, where the truncated octahedral shaped sodalite cages connect the prism.
