= Evgraf Fedorov =

Russian mathematician and crystallographer (1853–1919)

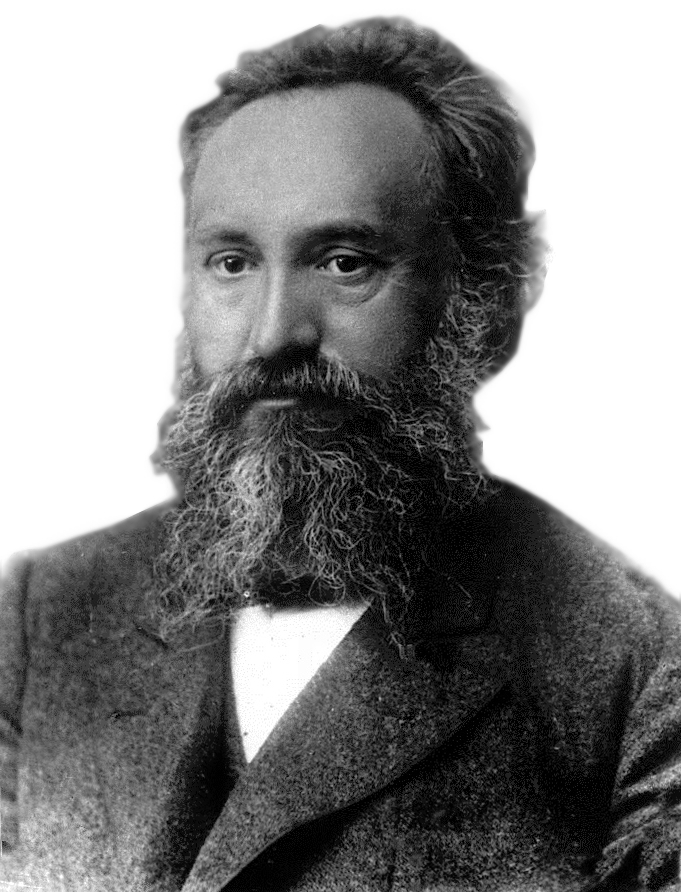
- Evgraf Stepanovich Fedorov
- Born: 22 December 1853; Orenburg, Russian Empire
- Died: 21 May 1919 (aged 65); Petrograd, RSFSR
- Known for: Fedorov groups Fedorov's theorem

Evgraf Stepanovich Fedorov (Russian: Евгра́ф Степа́нович Фёдоров, 22 December [O.S. 10 December] 1853 – 21 May 1919) was a Russian mathematician, crystallographer and mineralogist.

Fedorov was born in the Russian city of Orenburg. His father was a topographical engineer. The family later moved to Saint Petersburg. From the age of fifteen, he was deeply interested in the theory of polytopes, which later became his main research interest. He was a distinguished graduate of the Gorny Institute, which he joined at the age of 26. He was elected the first Director of the Institute in 1905.

He contributed to the identification of conditions under which a group of Euclidean motions must have a translational subgroup whose vectors span the Euclidean space. He undertook investigations into crystal structure as early as 1881. His best-known result is his 1891 derivation of the 230 symmetry space groups which now serve as the mathematical basis of structural analysis. He also proved that there are only 17 possible wallpaper groups which can tile a Euclidean plane. This was then proved independently by George Pólya in 1924. The proof that the list of wallpaper groups was complete only came after the much harder case of space groups had been settled. In 1895, he became a professor of geology at the Moscow Agricultural Institute (now the Timiryazev Academy). Fedorov died from pneumonia in 1919 during the Russian Civil War in Petrograd, RSFSR.

He developed the Fedorov stage for polarizing microscopes, a tool for crystallography which allows a mineral specimen to be studied under precise angles of tilt and rotation, providing an analysis of crystal structure.

== Publications ==
- His first book, Basics of Polytopes, was finished in 1879 and published in 1885. It offers a classification of polytopes and derives Fedorov polytopes, congruent polytopes that can completely fill space.
- He wrote the classic The Symmetry of Regular Systems of Figures in 1891, which contained the first cataloging of the 230 space groups. The same year the equivalent results were presented by German mathematician Schönflies. Fedorov and Schönflies had been intensively discussing the subject during their work, so the results can be somehow considered as joint ones, though Schönflies noted Fedorov's priority for some major ideas.
- He published his classic work The Theodolite Method in Mineralogy and Petrography in 1893.
- In 1906 he published Perfektsionizm (Perfectionism), a work he had started in the late 1870s. From a materialistic starting point he argued that natural conditions are themselves conditions of eternal change. He attacked authors claim that there is stability and equilibrium in nature. Contrariwise he claimed that evolution is the quality of living creatures rather than a tendency toward a "higher order" of stability, and equilibrium of organisms. He criticised Herbert Spencer's views arguing that such views when applied to the evolution of natural history focus attention on the least changeable. However, he argued that such views systematically failed to take into account the fact that equilibrium is attained only at the moment of death: for a living creature, changing forms are constantly developing. Thus, Fyodorov criticised the notion that the constant and the stable are the supreme mission of life. Rather he claimed that life never finally achieves anything but always strives to achieve. For him this is where the true philosophy of nature is to be found.
- Tsarstvo kristallov (Crystal Kingdom) was first published posthumously in 1920 and featured much of the work carried out by Fyodorov and his colleagues. during the previous of forty years. Here he noted that sciences which have been fully developed not only satisfy the spiritual needs of part of mankind but also provide great power to direct the active forces of nature for man’s use.

== Legacy ==
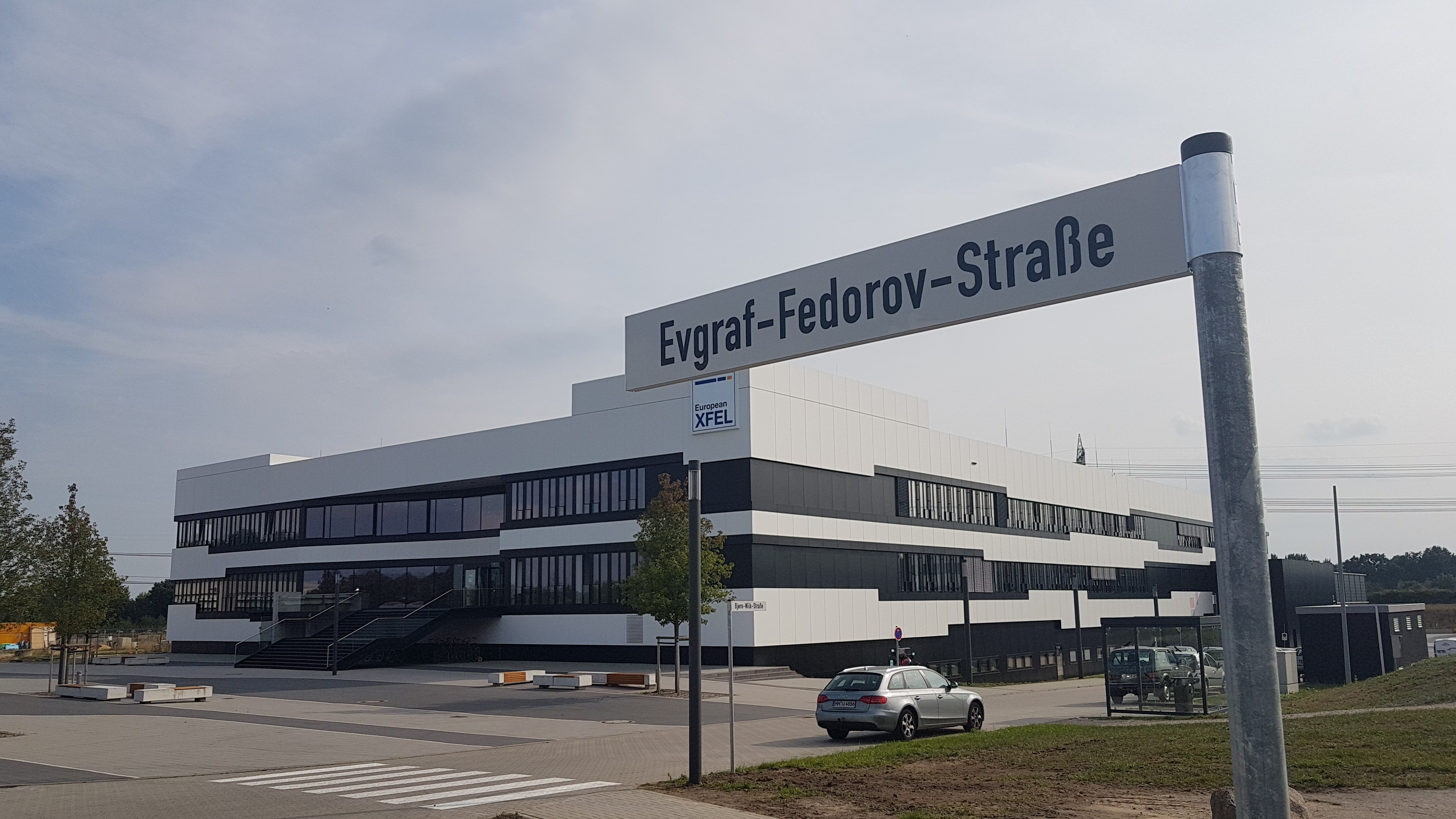
Evgraf Fjodorow Strasse

There is a street named after him on the site of the international X-ray laser research facility European XFEL in Schenefeld near Hamburg.

== See also ==
- Geometrical crystallography before X-rays
- Group theory
- List of Russian material scientists
- Parallelohedron
- Zonohedron
