= Rhombic hectotriadiohedron =

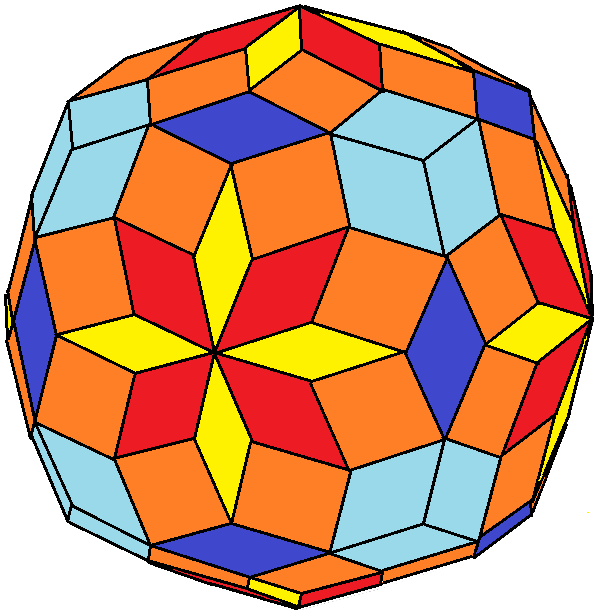
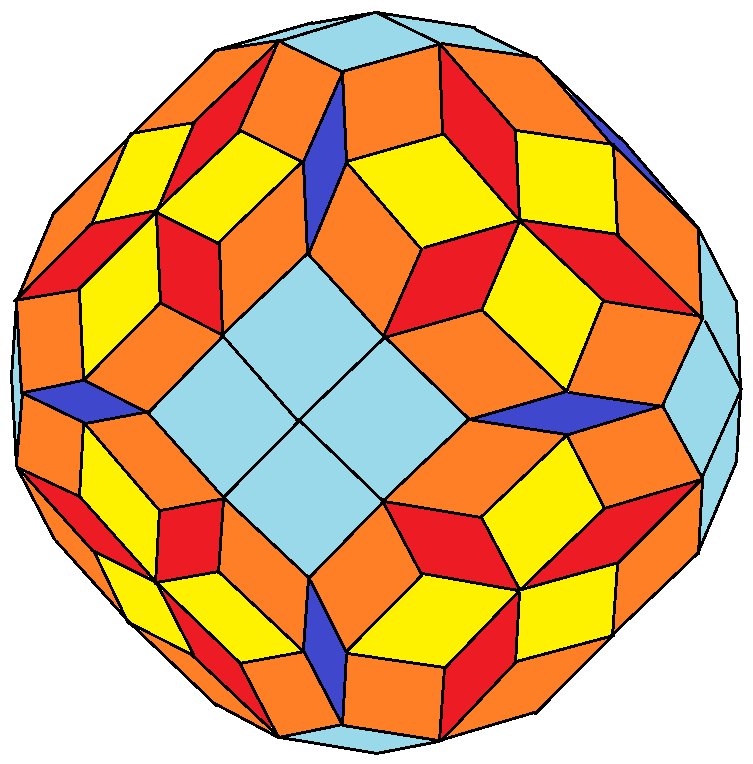
- Two different types: Type T and Type C, respectively
- Type: zonohedron
- Faces: 132 rhombi
- Edges: 264
- Vertices: 134
- Symmetry group: octahedral symmetry $\mathrm{O}_\mathrm{h}$
- Properties: convex

In geometry, a rhombic hectotriadiohedron, rhombhectotriadiohedron, rhombic 132-hedron, or equilateral dodecazonohedron is a polyhedron composed of 132 rhombic faces. Rhombic faces have five positions within octahedral symmetry. There are two topological types, with the same number of elements and the same symmetry but with a somewhat different arrangement of rhombic faces.

There are two types of rhombic hectotridiohedron: the type T and C. The type T has eight rhombi meeting at the center of a cube's six faces. The three meet at the 8 corners of a cube. The twelve are positioned along the twelve edges of a cube, and four more surround each of the twelve edges of a cube. This polyhedron is a 12-zone zonohedrification of the rhombicuboctahedron. The type C is a 12-zone zonohedrification of a truncated cube.

== See also ==
- Trigonal trapezohedron - 6 rhombi
- Rhombic dodecahedron - 12 rhombi
- Rhombic icosahedron - 20 rhombi
- Rhombic triacontahedron - 30 rhombi
- Rhombic hexecontahedron - 60 rhombi
- Rhombic enneacontahedron - 90 rhombi
