= Bilinski dodecahedron =

Polyhedron with 12 congruent golden rhombus faces

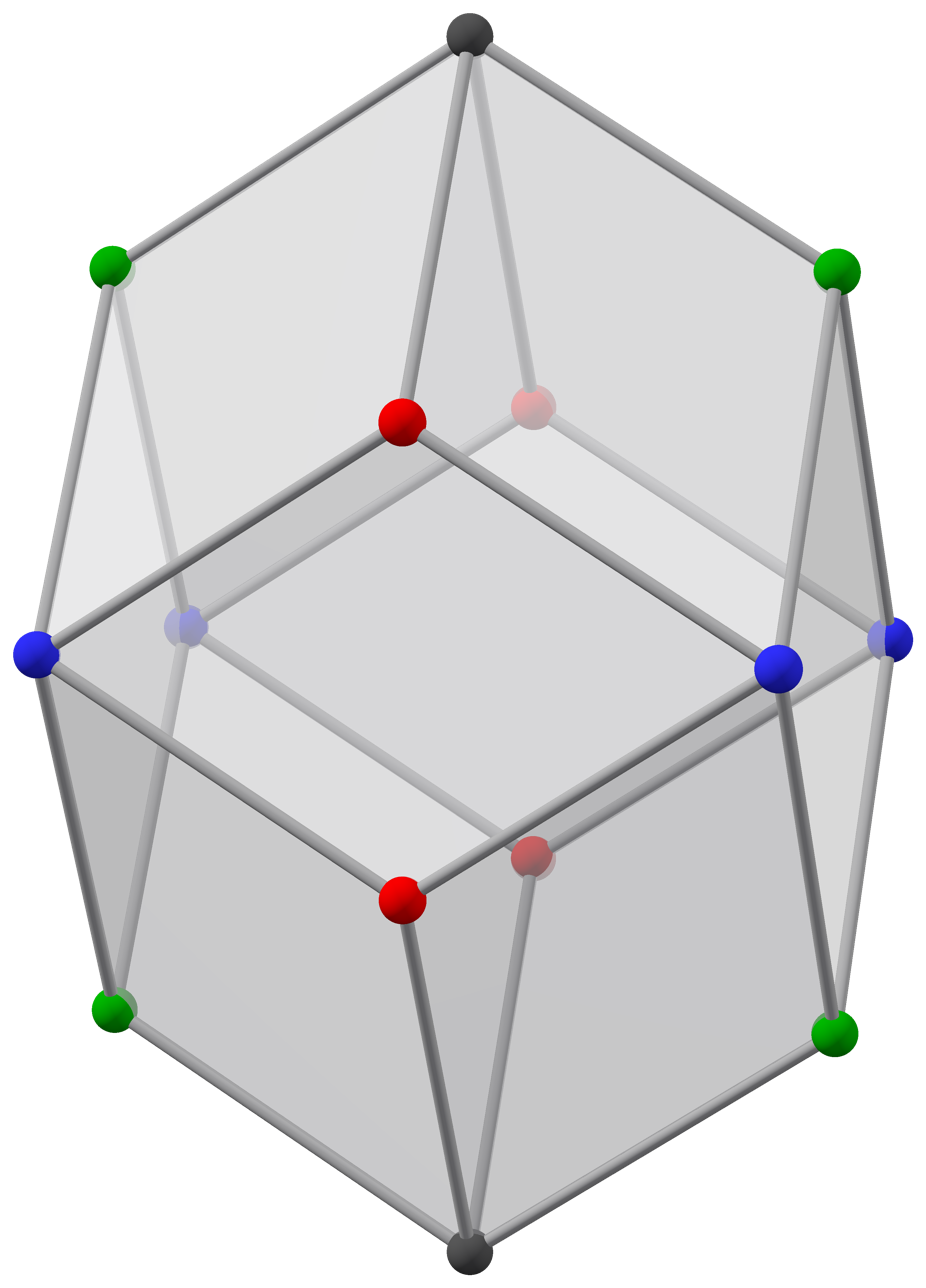
- Type: Parallelohedron; Space-filling polyhedron Zonohedron
- Faces: 12
- Edges: 24
- Vertices: 14
- Symmetry group: D_{2h}
- Properties: convex

3D model of a Bilinski dodecahedron

In geometry, the Bilinski dodecahedron is a convex polyhedron with twelve congruent golden rhombus faces. It has the same topology as the face-transitive rhombic dodecahedron, but a different geometry. It is a parallelohedron, a polyhedron that can tile space with translated copies of itself.

== History ==
This shape appears in a 1752 book by John Lodge Cowley, labeled as the dodecarhombus. It is named after Stanko Bilinski, who rediscovered it in 1960. Bilinski himself called it the rhombic dodecahedron of the second kind. Bilinski's discovery corrected a 75-year-old omission in Evgraf Fedorov's classification of convex polyhedra with congruent rhombic faces.

== Definition and properties ==
=== Definition ===
The Bilinski dodecahedron is formed by gluing together twelve congruent golden rhombi. These are rhombi whose diagonals are in the golden ratio:

$$\varphi = { {1 + \sqrt{5} } \over 2} \approx 1.618~034 .$$

The graph of the resulting polyhedron is isomorphic to the graph of the rhombic dodecahedron, but the faces are oriented differently: one pair of opposite rhombi has their long and short diagonals reversed relative to the orientation of the corresponding rhombi in the rhombic dodecahedron.

=== Symmetry ===
Because of its reversal, the Bilinski dodecahedron has a lower order of symmetry; its symmetry group is that of a rectangular cuboid: D_{2h}, [2,2], (*222), of order 8. This is a subgroup of octahedral symmetry; its elements are three 2-fold symmetry axes, three symmetry planes (which are also the axial planes of this solid), and a center of inversion symmetry. The rotation group of the Bilinski dodecahedron is D_{2}, [2,2]^{+}, (222), of order 4.

=== Vertices ===
Like the rhombic dodecahedron, the Bilinski dodecahedron has eight vertices of degree 3 and six of degree 4. It has two apices on the vertical axis, and four vertices on each axial plane. But due to the reversal, its non-apical vertices form two squares (red and green) and one rectangle (blue), and its fourteen vertices in all are of four different kinds:

- two degree-4 apices surrounded by four acute face angles (vertical-axis vertices, black in first figure);
- four degree-4 vertices surrounded by three acute and one obtuse face angles (horizontal-axial-plane vertices, blue in first figure);
- four degree-3 vertices surrounded by three obtuse face angles (one vertical-axial-plane vertices, red in first figure);
- four degree-3 vertices surrounded by two obtuse and one acute face angles (other vertical-axial-plane vertices, green in first figure).

=== Faces ===
The supplementary internal angles of a golden rhombus are:

- acute angle:

$$\alpha = \arctan 2 \approx 63.434~949 ^ \circ ;$$

- obtuse angle:

$$\beta = \pi - \arctan 2 \approx 116.565~051 ^ \circ .$$

The faces of the Bilinski dodecahedron are twelve congruent golden rhombi; but due to the reversal, they are of three different kinds:

- eight apical faces with all four kinds of vertices,
- two side faces with alternate blue and red vertices (front and back in first figure),
- two side faces with alternating blue and green vertices (left and right in first figure).

(See also the figure with edges and front faces colored.)

=== Edges ===
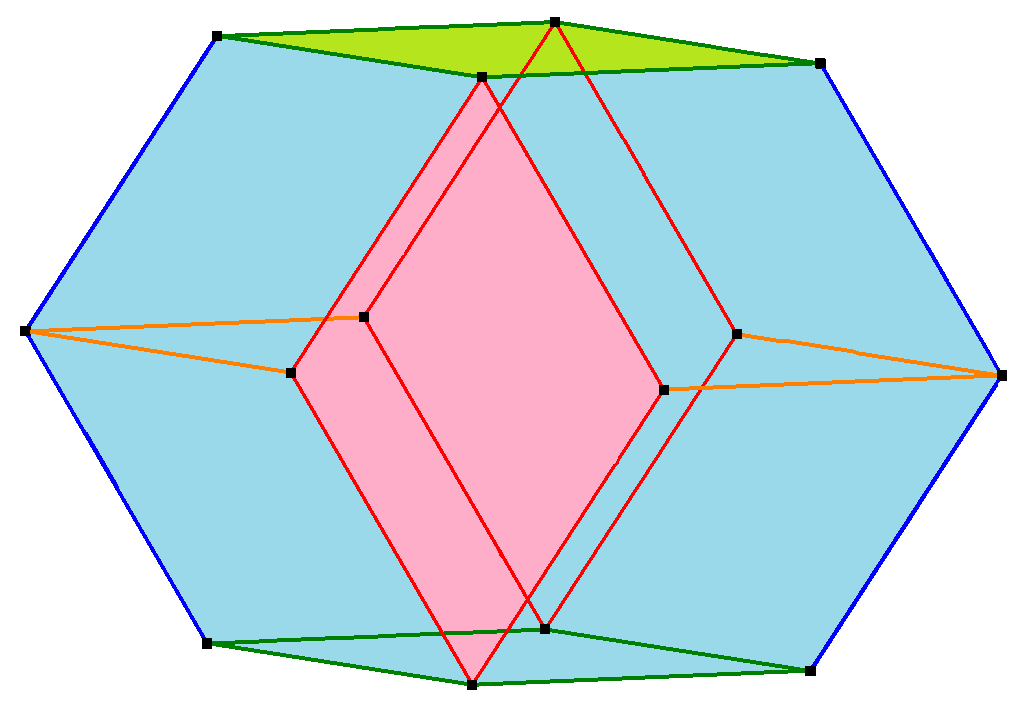
Edges and front faces colored by their symmetry positions

The 24 edges of the Bilinski dodecahedron have the same length; but due to the reversal, they are of four different kinds:

- four apical edges with black and red vertices (in first figure),
- four apical edges with black and green vertices (in first figure),
- eight side edges with blue and red vertices (in first figure),
- eight side edges with blue and green vertices (in first figure).

(See also the figure with edges and front faces colored.)

=== Cartesian coordinates ===
The vertices of a Bilinski dodecahedron with thickness 2 has the following Cartesian coordinates, where φ is the golden ratio:

degree	color	coordinates
3	red	(0, ±1, ±1)
3	green	(±φ, 0, ±φ)
4	blue	(±φ, ±1, 0)
4	black	(0, 0, ±φ^{2})
Red/green/blue vertices are in the plane perpendicular to the axis of the same color.

other properties

The Bilinski dodecahedron of this size has:

- length of longest body diagonal (i.e. lying on opposite black degree-4 vertices):

$$2 ~ \varphi ^{2} = 3 + \sqrt{5} \approx 5.236~068 ;$$

- length of shorter body diagonals (i.e. lying on opposite blue degree-4 vertices):

$$2 \sqrt{ 2 + \varphi } = \sqrt{ 2 \left( 5 + \sqrt{5} \right) } \approx 3.804~226 ;$$

- edge length:

$$\sqrt{ 2 + \varphi } = \sqrt{ \frac{ 5 + \sqrt{5} }{2} } \approx 1.902~113 .$$

=== In families of polyhedra ===
The Bilinski dodecahedron is a parallelohedron; thus it is also a space-filling polyhedron, and a zonohedron.

== Relation to rhombic dodecahedron ==
In a 1962 paper, H. S. M. Coxeter claimed that the Bilinski dodecahedron could be obtained by an affine transformation from the rhombic dodecahedron, but this is false.

In the rhombic dodecahedron: every long body diagonal (i.e. lying on opposite degree-4 vertices) is parallel to the short diagonals of four faces.

In the Bilinski dodecahedron: the longest body diagonal (i.e. lying on opposite black degree-4 vertices) is parallel to the short diagonals of two faces, and to the long diagonals of two other faces; the shorter body diagonals (i.e. lying on opposite blue degree-4 vertices) are not parallel to the diagonal of any face.

In any affine transformation of the rhombic dodecahedron: every long body diagonal (i.e. lying on opposite degree-4 vertices) remains parallel to four face diagonals, and these remain of the same (new) length.

== Zonohedra with golden rhombic faces ==
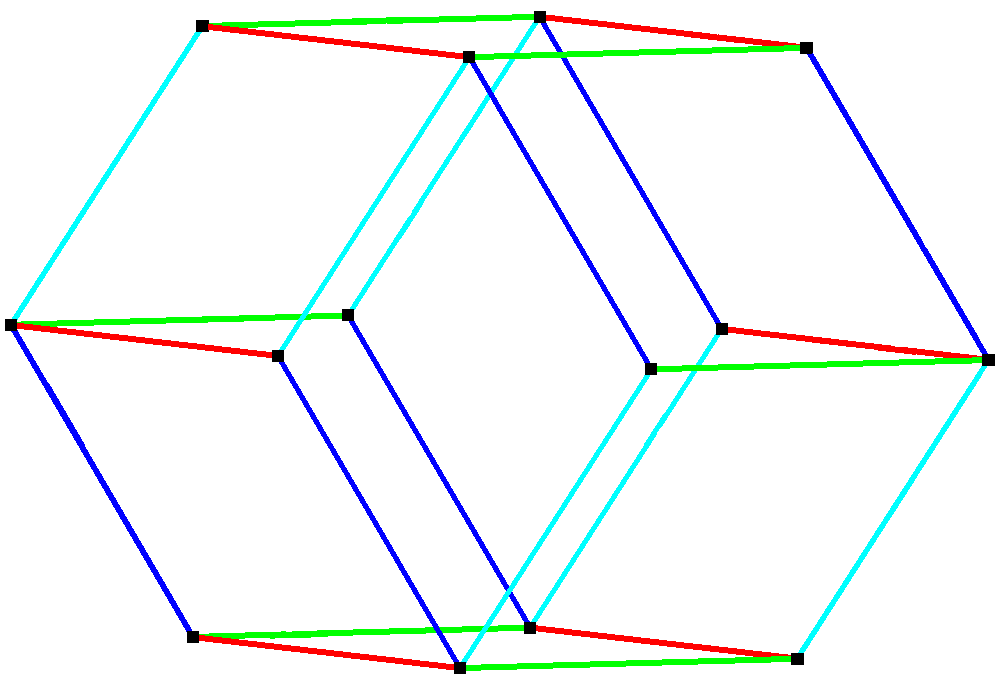
A Bilinski dodecahedron is a zonohedron; it has four sets of six parallel edges. Contracting any set of six parallel edges to zero length produces a golden rhombohedron.

The Bilinski dodecahedron can be formed from the rhombic triacontahedron (another zonohedron, with thirty congruent golden rhombic faces) by removing or collapsing two zones or belts of ten and eight golden rhombic faces with parallel edges. Removing only one zone of ten faces produces the rhombic icosahedron. Removing three zones of ten, eight, and six faces produces a golden rhombohedron. Thus removing a zone of six faces from the Bilinski dodecahedron produces a golden rhombohedron. The Bilinski dodecahedron can be dissected into four golden rhombohedra, two of each type.

The vertices of the zonohedra with golden rhombic faces can be computed by linear combinations of two to six generating edge vectors with coefficients 0 or 1. A belt m_{n} means a belt representing n directional vectors, and containing m coparallel edges with same length. The Bilinski dodecahedron has four belts of six coparallel edges.

These zonohedra are projection envelopes of the hypercubes, with n-dimensional projection basis, with golden ratio (φ). For n = 6, the specific basis is:

x = (1, φ, 0,−1, φ, 0),
y = (φ, 0, 1, φ, 0,−1),
z = (0, 1, φ, 0,−1, φ).

For n = 5, the basis is the same with the sixth column removed. For n = 4, the fifth and sixth columns are removed.

Zonohedra with golden rhombic faces
Solid name	Triacontahedron	Icosahedron	Dodecahedron	Hexahedron (acute/obtuse)	Rhombus (2-faced)
Full symmetry	I_{h} (order 120)	D_{5d} (order 20)	D_{2h} (order 8)	D_{3d} (order 12)	D_{2h} (order 8)
n Belts of (2(n−1))_{n} // edges	6 belts of 10_{6} // edges	5 belts of 8_{5} // edges	4 belts of 6_{4} // edges	3 belts of 4_{3} // edges	2 belts of 2_{2} // edges
n(n−1) Faces	30	20 (−10)	12 (−8)	6 (−6)	2 (−4)
2n(n−1) Edges	60	40 (−20)	24 (−16)	12 (−12)	4 (−8)
n(n−1)+2 Vertices	32	22 (−10)	14 (−8)	8 (−6)	4 (−4)
Solid image					
Parallel edges image					
Dissection	10 + 10	5 + 5	2 + 2		
Projective n-cube	6-cube	5-cube	4-cube	3-cube	2-cube
Projective n-cube image					
