= Archimede construction systems =

Achieving rhombic dodecahedral shapes

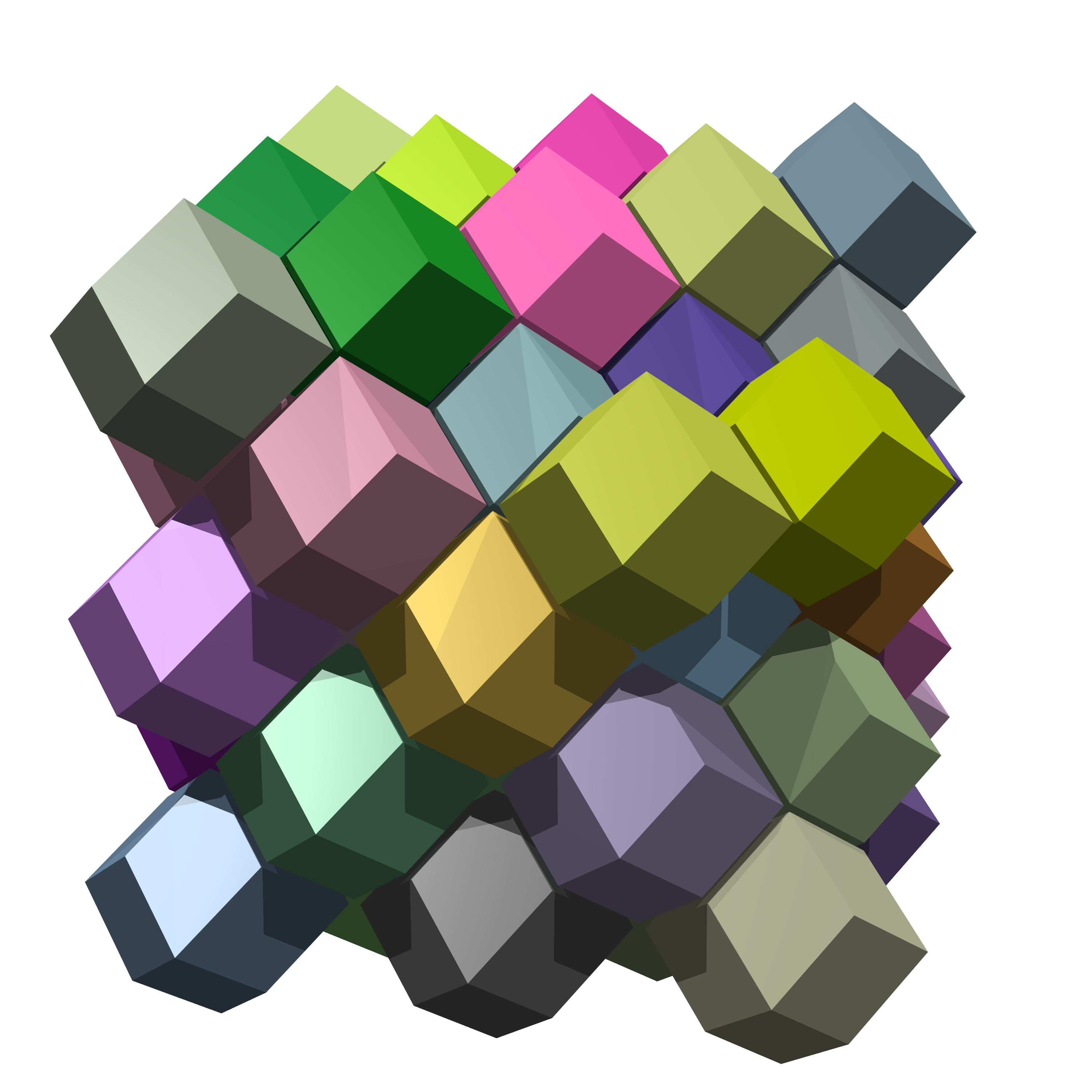
rhombic dodecahedral honeycomb

Archimede construction systems are construction techniques achieving rhombic dodecahedral shapes, a space-filling geometry. In America, most of these systems generate building envelopes made up of as little as two panel shapes and sizes, this feature allowing for maximum industrialization. These panels are generally pressure injected with a rigid structural insulating foam like polyurethane. In Europe and Asia, post and beam structure often create a dodecahedral shape that is later filled with different cladding materials. Although the basic geometry sometimes contains an entire house, most applications of the system are an agglomeration of cells each forming a rhombic dodecahedral living space that can be a room or a larger living area when combined with adjacent dodecahedral modules.

== History ==
The peculiar three-dimensional structure of the honey bee comb has intrigued for thousands of years. It is quite possible that some isolated construction project used a scaled-up version of this zonohedron, however a largely visible use of these shapes only appeared in the early 1980s. Les Systèmes Archimede Inc. of Tring Junction QC started to produce applying US4462191, a patent owned by J. Poirier who also co-founded the manufacturing firm with Placide Poulin .
