= Starball =

Star Ball, Starball, star ball or starball may refer to:

- Starball, UEFA Champions League logo of a football formed from twelve five-pointed stars
- starball, nickname or brand name for various sphere-shaped planetarium projectors
- Starball, Rainbow Arts computed game
- star ball, novelty billiard ball with a star logo
- Star Ball, Roger von Oech creative toy
- Star Ball, racehorse that won the Yerba Buena Stakes in 1977 and 1978
- Star Ball, name of various competitive ballroom dancing events including
  - Ohio Star Ball, United States
  - Ballroom Dancers' Federation championships' dinner dance
- The Star Ball (Stjärnbollen) 1991 book by Dénis Lindbohm
