= Golden rhombus =

Rhombus with diagonals in the golden ratio

The golden rhombus.

In geometry, a golden rhombus is a rhombus whose diagonals are in the golden ratio:

$${D\over d} = \varphi = {{1+\sqrt5}\over2} \approx 1.618~034$$

Equivalently, it is the Varignon parallelogram formed from the edge midpoints of a golden rectangle. Rhombi with this shape form the faces of several notable polyhedra. The golden rhombus should be distinguished from the two rhombi of the Penrose tiling, which are both related in other ways to the golden ratio but have different shapes than the golden rhombus.

== Angles ==
(See the characterizations and the basic properties of the general rhombus for angle properties.)

The internal supplementary angles of the golden rhombus are:

- Acute angle: $\alpha=2\arctan{1\over\varphi}$ ;

by using the arctangent addition formula (see inverse trigonometric functions):
$$\alpha=\arctan{{2\over\varphi}\over{1-({1\over\varphi})^2}}=\arctan{{2\over\varphi}\over{1\over\varphi}}=\arctan2\approx63.43495^\circ.$$

- Obtuse angle: $\beta=2\arctan\varphi=\pi-\arctan2\approx116.56505^\circ,$

which is also the dihedral angle of the dodecahedron.
Note: an "anecdotal" equality: $\pi- \arctan2=\arctan1+ \arctan3~.$

== Edge and diagonals ==
By using the parallelogram law (see the basic properties of the general rhombus):

The edge length of the golden rhombus in terms of the diagonal length $d$ is:

- $a={1\over2}\sqrt{d^2+(\varphi d)^2}={1\over2}\sqrt{1+\varphi^2}~d={{\sqrt{2+\varphi}}\over2}~d={1\over4}\sqrt{10+2\sqrt5}~d\approx0.95106~d~.~$ Hence:

The diagonal lengths of the golden rhombus in terms of the edge length $a$ are:

- $d={2a\over\sqrt{2+\varphi}}=2\sqrt{{3-\varphi}\over5}~a=\sqrt{2-{2\over\sqrt5}}~a\approx1.05146~a~.$

- $D={2\varphi a\over\sqrt{2+\varphi}}=2\sqrt{{2+\varphi}\over5}~a=\sqrt{2+{2\over\sqrt5}}~a\approx1.70130~a~.$

== Area ==
- By using the area formula of the general rhombus in terms of its diagonal lengths $D$ and $d$ :

The area of the golden rhombus in terms of its diagonal length $d$ is:
$$A = {{(\varphi d)\cdot d}\over2} = {{\varphi}\over2}~d^2 = {{1+\sqrt5}\over4}~d^2 \approx 0.80902~d^2~.$$

- By using the area formula of the general rhombus in terms of its edge length $a$ :

The area of the golden rhombus in terms of its edge length $a$ is:
$$A = (\sin(\arctan2))~a^2 = {2\over\sqrt5}~a^2 \approx 0.89443~a^2~.$$

Note: $\alpha+\beta = \pi$ , hence: $\sin\alpha = \sin\beta~.$

== As the faces of polyhedra ==
Several notable polyhedra have golden rhombi as their faces. They include the two golden rhombohedra (with six faces each), the Bilinski dodecahedron (with 12 faces), the rhombic dodecahedron (with 12 faces), the rhombic icosahedron (with 20 faces), the rhombic triacontahedron (with 30 faces), and the nonconvex rhombic hexecontahedron (with 60 faces). The first five of these are the only convex polyhedra with golden rhomb faces, but there exist infinitely many nonconvex polyhedra having this shape for all of their faces.

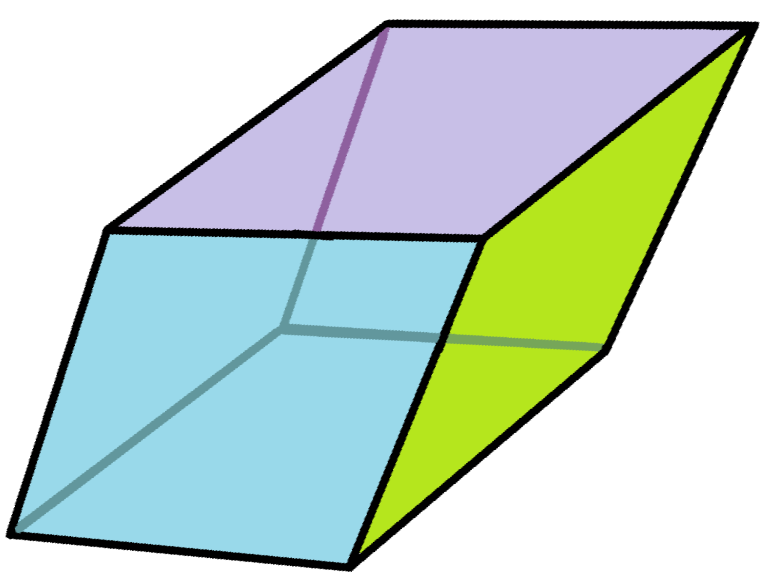
Acute golden rhombohedron

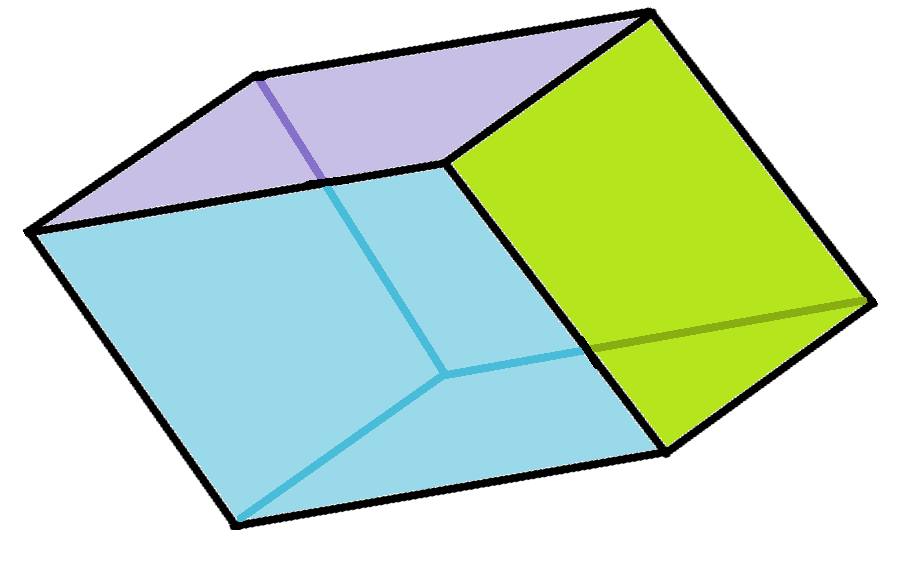
Obtuse golden rhombohedron

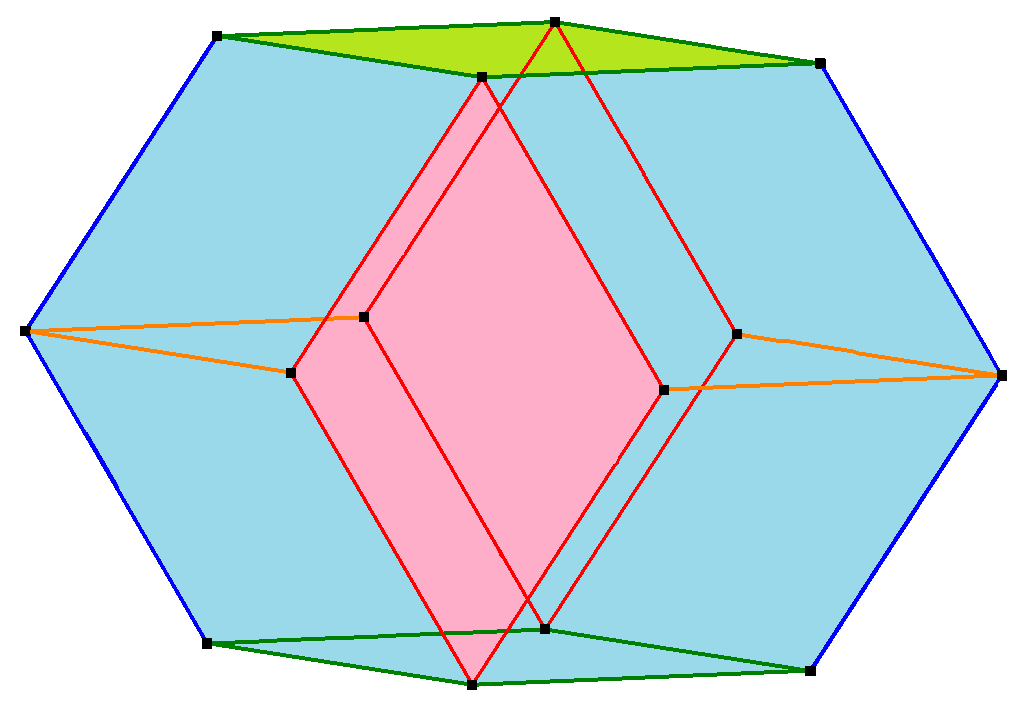
Bilinski dodecahedron

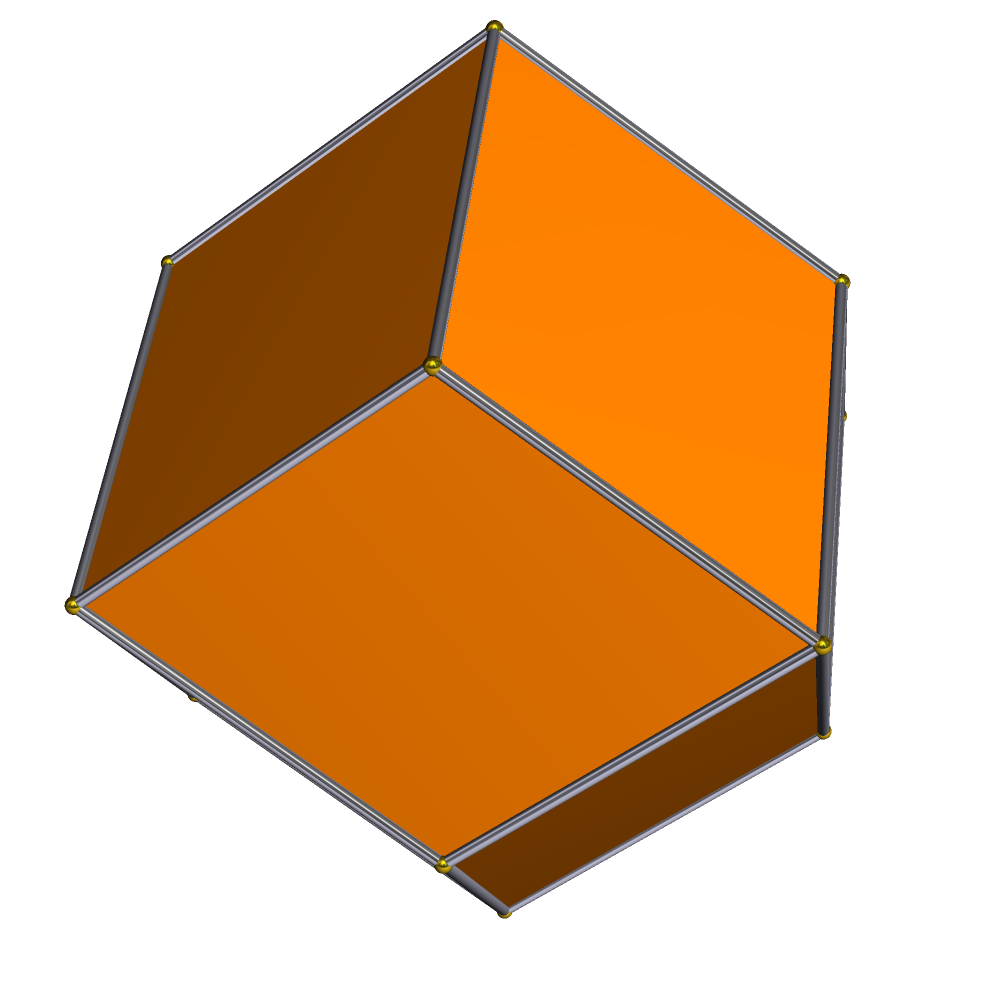
Rhombic dodecahedron

rhombic icosahedron

rhombic triacontahedron

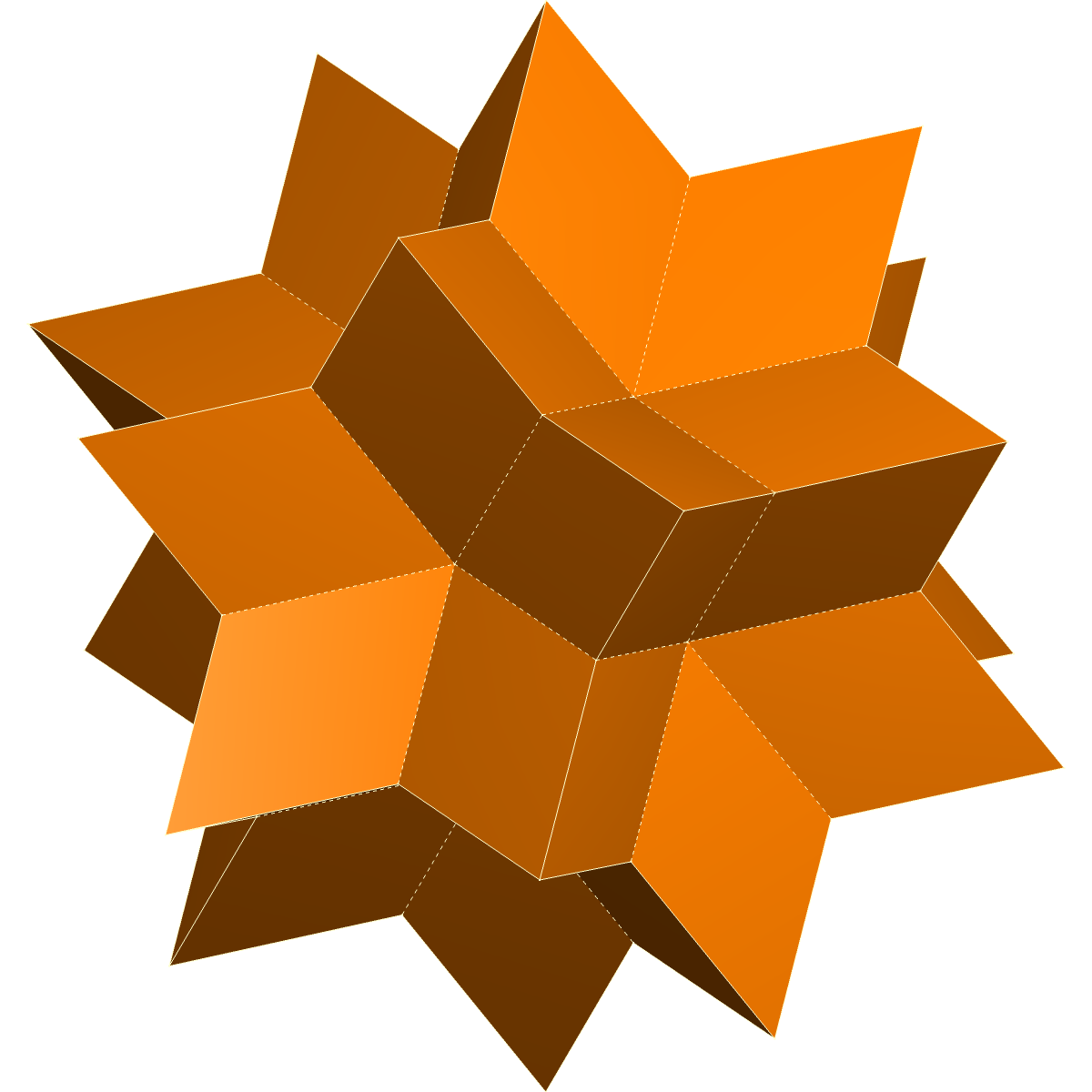
rhombic hexecontahedron

== See also ==
- Golden triangle
