= Stanko Bilinski =

Stanko Bilinski (22 April 1909 in Našice – 6 April 1998 in Zagreb) was a Croatian mathematician and academician. He was a professor at the University of Zagreb and a fellow of the Croatian Academy of Sciences and Arts.

In 1960, he discovered a rhombic dodecahedron of the second kind, the Bilinski dodecahedron. Like the standard rhombic dodecahedron, this convex polyhedron has 12 congruent rhombus sides, but they are differently shaped and arranged. Bilinski's discovery corrected a 75-year-old omission in Evgraf Fedorov's classification of convex polyhedra with congruent rhombic faces.
