= Equiprojective polyhedra =

Convex polyhedron property

In mathematics, a convex polyhedron is defined to be $k$-equiprojective if every orthogonal projection of the polygon onto a plane, in a direction not parallel to a face of the polyhedron, forms a $k$-gon. For example, a cube is 6-equiprojective: every projection not parallel to a face forms a hexagon, More generally, every prism over a convex $k$ is $(k+2)$-equiprojective. Zonohedra are also equiprojective. Hasan and his colleagues later found more equiprojective polyhedra by truncating equally the tetrahedron and three other Johnson solids.

Hasan & Lubiw (2008) shows there is an $O(n \log n)$ time algorithm to determine whether a given polyhedron is equiprojective.
