= Golden ellipse =

A golden ellipse is an ellipse in which the aspect ratio of its two semi-axes $a$ and $b$ corresponds to the golden ratio.

== Equivalent characterization ==

Given is a annulus with outer radius $a$ and inner radius $b$ as well as an ellipse with semi-major axis $a$ and semi-minor axis $b$, where $a$ and $b$ are positive real numbers.

Then the ratio $\frac{a}{b}$ corresponds to the golden ratio $\Phi$ if and only if the annulus and the ellipse have the same area.

The proof results from the following equivalence chain:
$$\pi a^2-\pi b^2=\pi ab \Leftrightarrow a^2-ba-b^2=0 \Leftrightarrow a=\frac{b}{2}\ \pm\sqrt{\frac{b^2}{4}+b^2} \Leftrightarrow a=\frac{1}{2}(1 \pm \sqrt{5}) \cdot b$$

Since only the positive solution is possible, after division by $b$ we get:
$$\frac{a}{b}=\frac{1}{2}(1 + \sqrt{5})=\Phi$$

== Relationship to the golden rectangle ==

The golden ellipse can be inscribed in a golden rectangle with the side lengths $2a$ and $2b$.
