= Golden rectangle =

Rectangle with side lengths in the golden ratio

a/b = (a+b)/a = φ.

In geometry, a golden rectangle is a rectangle with side lengths in aspect ratio $\varphi :1$, the golden ratio, where $\varphi = \tfrac12\bigl(1 + \sqrt5\bigr) \approx {}$$1.618$. That is, one side of the rectangle is $\varphi$ times longer than another.

Golden rectangles exhibit a special form of self-similarity: if a square is added to the long side, or removed from the short side, the result is a golden rectangle as well.

== Construction ==
Construction of a golden rectangle. (Note: $(\tfrac{1}{2})^2 + 1^2 = \tfrac{5}{2^2}$)

Golden spiral and intersecting diagonals.

Owing to the Pythagorean theorem, the diagonal dividing one half of a square equals the radius of a circle whose outermost point is the corner of a golden rectangle added to the square. Thus, a golden rectangle can be constructed with only a straightedge and compass in four steps:

1. Draw a square
2. Draw a line from the midpoint of one side of the square to an opposite corner
3. Use that line as the radius to draw an arc that defines the height of the rectangle
4. Complete the golden rectangle

A distinctive feature of this shape is that when a square section is added—or removed—the product is another golden rectangle, having the same aspect ratio as the first. Square addition or removal can be repeated infinitely, in which case corresponding corners of the squares form an infinite sequence of points on the golden spiral, the unique logarithmic spiral with this property. Diagonal lines drawn between the first two orders of embedded golden rectangles will define the intersection point of the diagonals of all the embedded golden rectangles; Clifford A. Pickover referred to this point as "the Eye of God".

=== Golden whirl ===
A whirl of golden rectangles.

Divide a square into four congruent right triangles with legs in ratio 1 : 2 and arrange these in the shape of a golden rectangle, enclosing a similar rectangle that is scaled by factor $\tfrac{1}{\varphi}$ and rotated about the centre by $\arctan(\tfrac{1}{2}).$ Repeating the construction at successively smaller scales results in four infinite sequences of adjoining right triangles, tracing a whirl of converging golden rectangles.

The logarithmic spiral through the vertices of adjacent triangles has polar slope $k =\frac{\ln( \varphi)}{\arctan( \tfrac{1}{2})} .$ The parallelogram between the pair of upright grey triangles has perpendicular diagonals in ratio $\varphi$, hence is a golden rhombus.

If the triangle has legs of lengths 1 and 2 then each discrete spiral has length $\varphi^2 =\sum_{n=0}^{\infty} \varphi^{-n} .$ The areas of the triangles in each spiral region sum to $\varphi =\sum_{n=0}^{\infty} \varphi^{-2n} ;$ the perimeters are equal to $5 +\sqrt{5}$ (grey) and $4\varphi$ (yellow regions).

== History ==
The proportions of the golden rectangle have been claimed for the Babylonian Tablet of Shamash (c. 888–855 BC). However, Mario Livio calls any knowledge of the golden ratio in ancient Babylon or ancient Egypt "highly unlikely".

According to Livio, since the publication of Luca Pacioli's Divina proportione in 1509, "the Golden Ratio started to become available to artists in theoretical treatises that were not overly mathematical, that they could actually use."

The 1927 Villa Stein designed by Le Corbusier, some of whose architecture utilizes the golden ratio, features dimensions that closely approximate golden rectangles.

== Relation to regular polygons and polyhedra ==
Construction of half-golden rectangle (central right triangle) from polygons.

Three golden rectangles in an icosahedron.

Euclid gives an alternative construction of the golden rectangle using three polygons circumscribed by congruent circles: a regular decagon, hexagon, and pentagon. The respective lengths a, b, and c of the sides of these three polygons satisfy the equation a^{2} + b^{2} = c^{2}, so line segments with these lengths form a right triangle (by the converse of the Pythagorean theorem). The ratio of the side length of the hexagon to the decagon is the golden ratio, so this triangle forms half of a golden rectangle.

The convex hull of two opposite edges of a regular icosahedron forms a golden rectangle. The twelve vertices of the icosahedron can be decomposed in this way into three mutually-perpendicular golden rectangles, whose boundaries are linked in the pattern of the Borromean rings.

== Relation to angles of the golden triangle ==
Powers of φ within a golden rectangle.

Assume a golden rectangle has been constructed as indicated above, with height 1, length $\varphi$ and diagonal length $\textstyle \sqrt{\varphi^2 + 1}$. The triangles on the diagonal have altitudes $\textstyle 1 \big/\sqrt{1 + \varphi^{-2}}\,;$ each perpendicular foot divides the diagonal in ratio $\varphi^2.$

If a horizontal line is drawn through the intersection point of the diagonal and the internal edge of the square, the original golden rectangle and the two scaled copies along the diagonal have linear sizes in the ratios $\varphi^2 :\varphi :1\,,$ the square and rectangle opposite the diagonal both have areas equal to $\varphi^{-2}.$ The foot of altitude V coincides with the pole of the golden spiral and divides the diagonal of the lower right rectangle in ratio $\varphi^2$.

Relative to vertex A, the coordinates of feet of altitudes U and V are $\left( \tfrac{1}{\sqrt{5}}, \tfrac{1}{\varphi \sqrt{5}} \right)$ and $\left( \tfrac{\varphi^2}{\sqrt{5}}, \tfrac{\varphi}{\sqrt{5}} \right)$; the length of line segment $\overline{U V}$ is equal to altitude $h.$

If the diagram is further subdivided by perpendicular lines through U and V, the lengths of the diagonal and its subsections can be expressed as trigonometric functions of arguments 72 and 36 degrees, the angles of the golden triangle:

Diagonal segments of the golden rectangle measure nested pentagons. The ratio AU:SV is φ^{2}.

$$\begin{align}
\overline{A B} + \overline{A S} &=\tan(72^\circ)\\
\overline{A B} = {\textstyle \sqrt{\varphi^2 +1}} &=2\sin(72^\circ)\\
\overline{A V} =\varphi \big/\overline{A S} &=\cot(36^\circ)\\
\overline{A S} ={\textstyle \sqrt{1 +\varphi^{-2}}} &=2\sin(36^\circ)\\
\overline{U V} =1 \big/ \overline{A S} &=\cot(36^\circ) \varphi^{-1}\\
\overline{S B} =\overline{A S} \big/\varphi &=\tan(36^\circ)\\
\overline{U S} =2 \big/(\varphi\overline{A B}) &=2\cot(72^\circ)\\
\overline{A U} =1 \big/\overline{A B} &=\varphi\cot(72^\circ)\\
\overline{U V} - \overline{A U} &=\cot(72^\circ)\\
\overline{S V} =(2 -\varphi) \big/\overline{A B} &=\cot(72^\circ) \varphi^{-1},
\end{align}$$

with $\varphi =2\cos(36^\circ).$

Both the lengths of the diagonal sections and the trigonometric values are elements of biquadratic number field $\textstyle K =\mathbb{Q}\Bigl(\sqrt{\varphi\sqrt{5}}\, \Bigr)$.

The golden rhombus with edge $\tfrac{1}{2}$ has diagonal lengths equal to $\overline{U V}$ and $\overline{A U}$. The regular pentagon with side length $2\varphi^{-1} =\sec(36^\circ)$ has area $5\overline{A U}.$ Its five diagonals divide the pentagon into golden triangles and gnomons, and an upturned, scaled copy at the centre. Since the regular pentagon is defined by its side length and the angles of the golden triangle, it follows that all measures can be expressed in powers of $\varphi$ and the diagonal segments of the golden rectangle, as illustrated above.

Intervals on the diagonal of the golden rectangle.

Interpreting the diagonal sections as musical string lengths results in a set of ten corresponding pitches, one of which doubles at the octave. Mapping the intervals in logarithmic scale — with the "golden octave" equal to $\varphi^4$ — shows equally tempered semitones, minor thirds and one major second in the span of an eleventh. An analysis in musical terms is substantiated by the single exceptional pitch proportional to $\overline{U S}$, that approximates the harmonic seventh within remarkable one cent accuracy. (Note: Absent in modern 12 equal, this interval is accurately rendered in quarter-comma meantone temperament. Relative to base note D, the two augmented sixths E♭ - c♯ and B♭ - g♯ with frequency ratio 5^{5/2}/2^{5} are only 3 cents short of just ratio 7/4.)

This set of ten tones can be partitioned into two modes of the pentatonic scale: the palindromic "Egyptian" mode (red dots, Chinese rui bin diao guqin tuning) and the stately "blues minor" mode (blue dots, Chinese man gong diao tuning).

== See also ==
- Golden triangle – triangle with sides in the golden ratio
- Golden ellipse – ellipse with the aspect ratio of its two semi-axes corresponding to the golden ratio
- Kepler triangle – Right triangle related to the golden ratio
- Golden rhombus – Rhombus with diagonals in the golden ratio
- Square root of 5 – Algebraic relationship between √5 and φ
- Rabatment of the rectangle – Cutting a square from a rectangle
