= John Lodge Cowley =

John Lodge Cowley (1719, Kingdom of Great Britain – buried 1797, Great Britain) was an English cartographer, geologist and mathematician.

John Cowley was a professor of mathematics at the Royal Military Academy, Woolwich, London, for a number of years between 1761 and 1773. He was elected a Fellow of the Royal Society in April, 1768.

His mathematical methods were famous, but he was also an important geographer as well as Cartographer Royal to King George II. He specialised in maps that depicted the counties of the United Kingdom from which arose his most famous work, Counties of England. Cowley published several maps, many of minute detail, and on them often appeared his name although on others appeared the name of Emanuel Bowen acting as engraver. Another one of his works of some note, but less famous than The Counties, was A new and easy introduction to the study of geography which was published by Thomas Cox and James Hodges. The work was structured as questions and answers with decorative maps added later. His maps contained longer titles than those usually found on the standard miniature maps. John Cowley collaborated with Robert Dodsley for several years in the creation of his maps which explains why the maps were ascribed to Dodsley/Cowley. Among his works are remembered the superb engravings representing the constellation drawn on glass globes created by Thomas Heath.

He also published a number of introductory works on solid geometry incorporating fold-up figures: Geometry Made Easy (1752), An Appendix to Euclid's Elements (1758) and The Theory of Perspective Demonstrated (1765).

He taught geometry to subscribers of the St. Martin's Lane Academy, a drawing school established by William Hogarth and John Ellys.

Cowley died in Walworth, Surrey. He had a daughter called Mrs Johnstone who inherited her father's passion for science and over the years instructed many members of the British nobility in the use of globes and maps.

== See also ==
- List of cartographers
- History of cartography
- Willem Blaeu
- Joan Blaeu
- Glass celestial sphere engraved by Cowley in 1739, in the Science Museum's collection, London

== Gallery ==
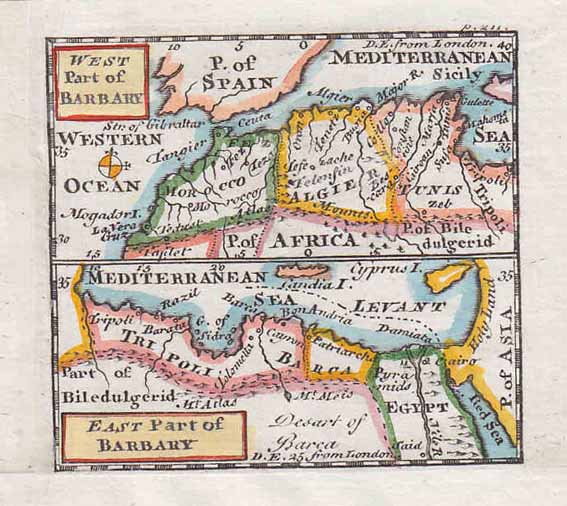
Map of north Africa taken from A New and easy introduction to the study of geography, J.L.Cowley

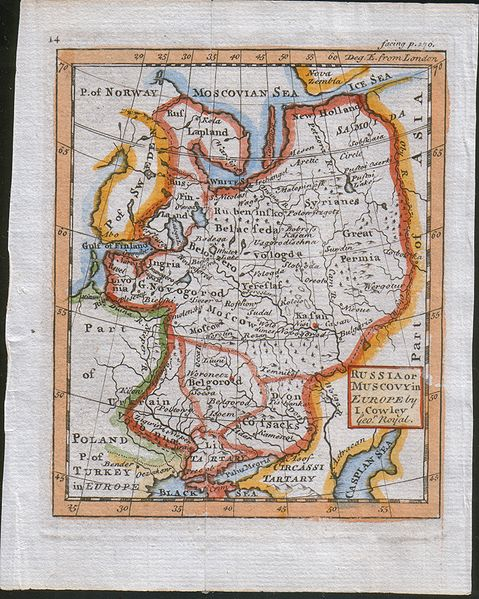
Map of Russia

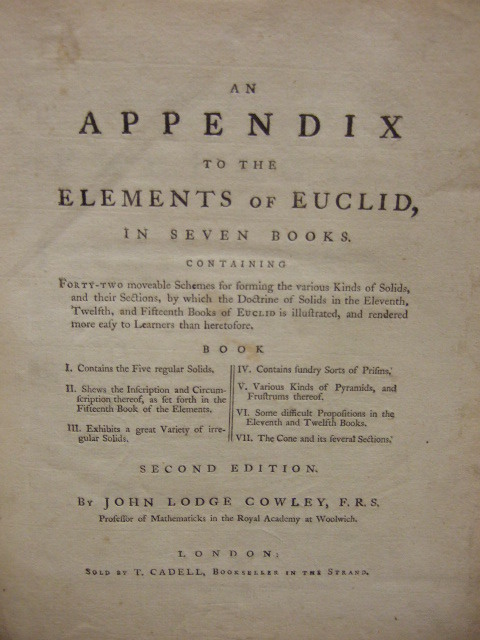
An Appendix to Euclid's Elements in Seven Books

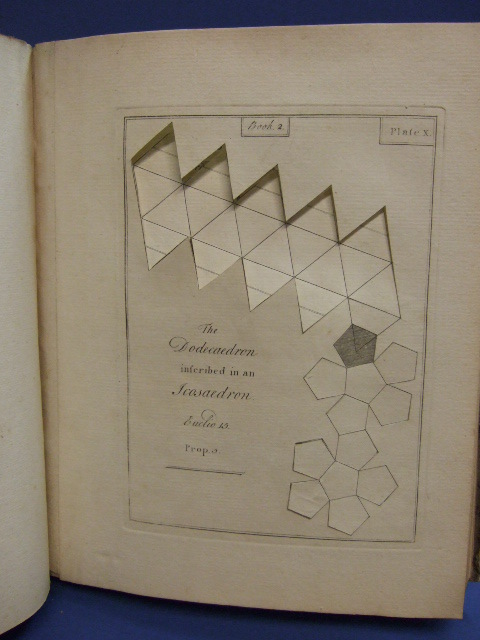

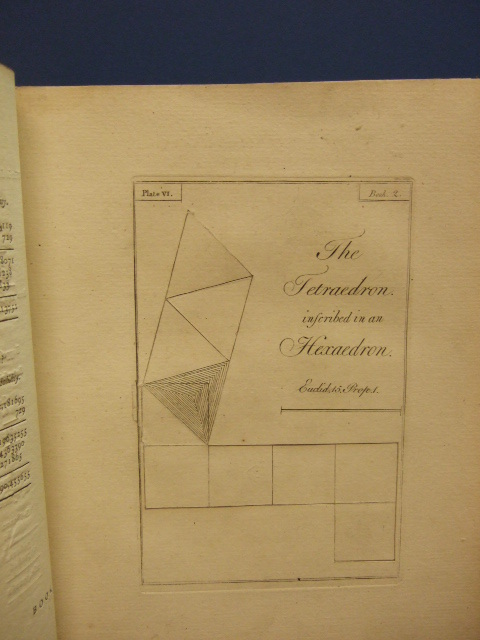

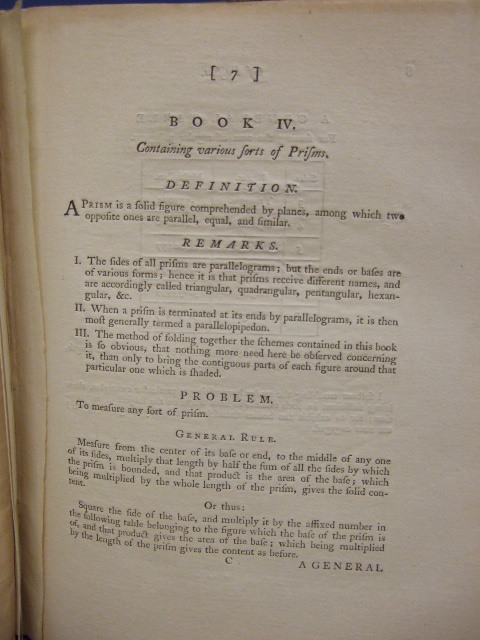

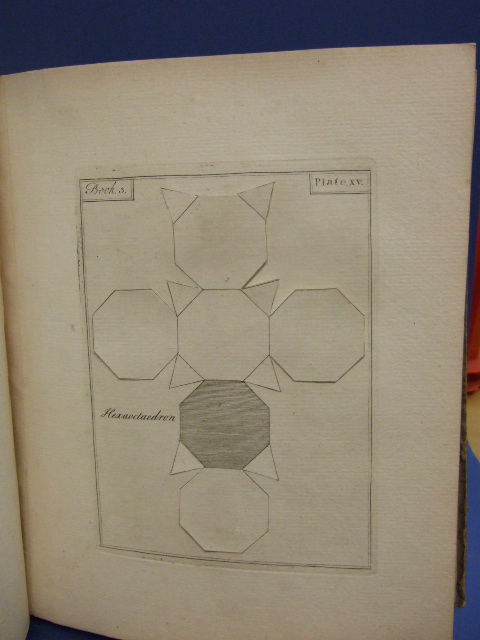
