= Rhombus =

Quadrilateral with sides of equal length

- A rhombus in two different orientations
- Type: quadrilateral, trapezoid, parallelogram, kite
- Edges and vertices: 4
- Schläfli symbol: { } + { } {2_{α}}
- Symmetry group: Dihedral (D_{2}), [2], (*22), order 4
- Area: $K = \frac{p \cdot q}{2}$ (half the product of the diagonals)
- Properties: convex, isotoxal
- Dual polygon: rectangle

The rhombus has a square as a special case, and is a special case of a kite and parallelogram.

In geometry, a rhombus (pl.: rhombi or rhombuses) is an equilateral quadrilateral, a quadrilateral whose four sides all have the same length. Other names for rhombus include diamond, lozenge, and calisson.

Every rhombus is a simple polygon (having no self-intersections). A rhombus is a special case of a parallelogram and a kite. A rhombus with right angles is a square. (Note: Euclid's original definition and some English dictionaries' definition of rhombus excludes squares, but modern mathematicians prefer the inclusive definition.) A non-square rhombus has two opposite acute angles and two opposite obtuse angles.

== Etymology ==
The name rhombus comes from Greek ῥόμβος rhómbos, meaning something that spins, such as a bullroarer or an ancient precursor of the button whirligig. The word was used both by Euclid and Archimedes, who also used the term "solid rhombus" for a bicone, two right circular cones sharing a common base. A planar rhombus is a cross section of a bicone.

The name diamond comes from the shape of an octahedral diamond gemstone; the diamonds suit in playing cards is named after the shape – it was originally called carreaux (lit. "squares") in French. In the context of polyiamonds, shapes like polyominos but constructed from equilateral triangles, a diamond is a rhombus with a 60° angle.

The etymology of lozenge is uncertain. It might come from a shape of some lauzinaj almond pastries, or from the shape of tombstones. A lozenge is often specifically to a rhombus with a 45° angle.

A calisson is a type of rhombus-shaped French sweet.

== Characterizations ==
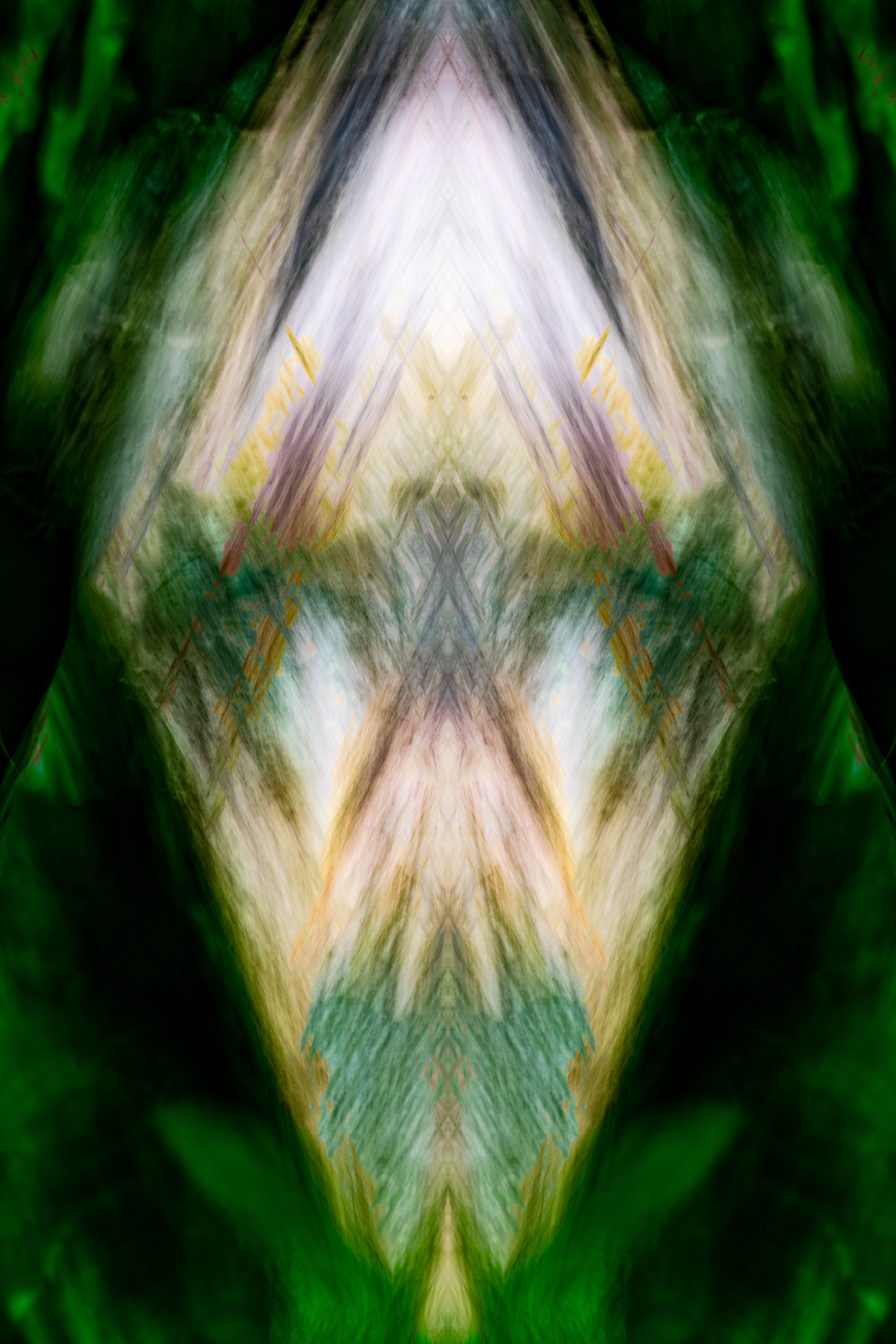
An ICM photo with a diamond-shaped composition.

A simple (non-self-intersecting) quadrilateral is a rhombus if and only if it is any one of the following:

- a parallelogram in which a diagonal bisects an interior angle
- a parallelogram in which at least two consecutive sides are equal in length
- a parallelogram in which the diagonals are perpendicular (an orthodiagonal parallelogram)
- a quadrilateral with four sides of equal length (by definition)
- a quadrilateral in which the diagonals are perpendicular and bisect each other
- a quadrilateral in which each diagonal bisects two opposite interior angles
- a quadrilateral ABCD possessing a point P in its plane such that the four triangles ABP, BCP, CDP, and DAP are all congruent
- a quadrilateral ABCD in which the incircles in triangles ABC, BCD, CDA and DAB have a common point

== Basic properties ==
Every rhombus has two diagonals connecting pairs of opposite vertices, and two pairs of parallel sides. Using congruent triangles, one can prove that the rhombus is symmetric across each of these diagonals. It follows that any rhombus has the following properties:

- Opposite angles of a rhombus have equal measure.
- The two diagonals of a rhombus are perpendicular; that is, a rhombus is an orthodiagonal quadrilateral.
- Its diagonals bisect opposite angles.

The first property implies that every rhombus is a parallelogram. A rhombus therefore has all of the properties of a parallelogram: for example, opposite sides are parallel; adjacent angles are supplementary; the two diagonals bisect one another; any line through the midpoint bisects the area; and the sum of the squares of the sides equals the sum of the squares of the diagonals (the parallelogram law). Thus denoting the common side as a and the diagonals as p and q, in every rhombus
$$\displaystyle 4a^2=p^2+q^2.$$

Not every parallelogram is a rhombus, though any parallelogram with perpendicular diagonals (the second property) is a rhombus. In general, any quadrilateral with perpendicular diagonals, one of which is a line of symmetry, is a kite. Every rhombus is a kite, and any quadrilateral that is both a kite and parallelogram is a rhombus.

A rhombus is a tangential quadrilateral. That is, it has an inscribed circle that is tangent to all four sides.

A rhombus. The height h is the perpendicular distance between any two non-adjacent sides, which equals the diameter of the circle inscribed. The diagonals of lengths p and q are the red dotted line segments.

== Diagonals ==
The length of the diagonals p = AC and q = BD can be expressed in terms of the rhombus side a and one vertex angle α as
$$p=a\sqrt{2+2\cos{\alpha}}$$
and
$$q=a\sqrt{2-2\cos{\alpha}}.$$
These formulas are a direct consequence of the law of cosines.

== Inradius ==
The inradius (the radius of a circle inscribed in the rhombus), denoted by r, can be expressed in terms of the diagonals p and q as
$$r = \frac{p \cdot q}{2\sqrt{p^2+q^2}},$$
or in terms of the side length a and any vertex angle α or β as
$$r = \frac{a\sin\alpha}{2} = \frac{a\sin\beta}{2}.$$

== Area ==
As for all parallelograms, the area K of a rhombus is the product of its base and its height (h). The base is simply any side length a:
$$K = a \cdot h .$$

The area can also be expressed as the base squared times the sine of any angle:
$$K = a^2 \cdot \sin \alpha = a^2 \cdot \sin \beta ,$$
or in terms of the height and a vertex angle:
$$K=\frac{h^2}{\sin\alpha} ,$$
or as half the product of the diagonals p, q:
$$K = \frac{p \cdot q}{2} ,$$
or as the semiperimeter times the radius of the circle inscribed in the rhombus (inradius):
$$K = 2a \cdot r .$$

Another way, in common with parallelograms, is to consider two adjacent sides as vectors, forming a bivector, so the area is the magnitude of the bivector (the magnitude of the vector product of the two vectors), which is the determinant of the two vectors' Cartesian coordinates: K = x_{1}y_{2} – x_{2}y_{1}.

== Dual properties ==
The dual polygon of a rhombus is a rectangle:

- A rhombus has all sides equal, while a rectangle has all angles equal.
- A rhombus has opposite angles equal, while a rectangle has opposite sides equal.
- A rhombus has an inscribed circle, while a rectangle has a circumcircle.
- A rhombus has an axis of symmetry through each pair of opposite vertex angles, while a rectangle has an axis of symmetry through each pair of opposite sides.
- The diagonals of a rhombus intersect at equal angles, while the diagonals of a rectangle are equal in length.
- The figure formed by joining the midpoints of the sides of a rhombus is a rectangle, and vice versa.

== Cartesian equation ==
The sides of a rhombus centered at the origin, with diagonals each falling on an axis, consist of all points (x, y) satisfying
$$\left|\frac{x}{a}\right|\! + \left|\frac{y}{b}\right|\! = 1.$$

The vertices are at $(\pm a, 0)$ and $(0, \pm b).$ This is a special case of the superellipse, with exponent 1.

== Other properties ==
As topological square tilings	Rhombille tiling

The rhombic lattice, or centered rectangular lattice, is one of the five types of two-dimensional lattice. Its fundamental domain is a rhombus, which tiles the plane. Rhombi of an arbitrary shape can also tile the plane periodically another way, zigzagging. The 60° rhombus specifically can tile the plane in a third way, the rhombille tiling

Three-dimensional analogues of a rhombus include the bipyramid and the bicone as a surface of revolution.

=== As the faces of a polyhedron ===
Convex polyhedra with rhombi include the infinite set of rhombic zonohedrons, which can be seen as projective envelopes of hypercubes.

- A rhombohedron (also called a rhombic hexahedron) is a three-dimensional figure like a cuboid (also called a rectangular parallelepiped), except that its 3 pairs of parallel faces are up to 3 types of rhombi instead of rectangles.
- The rhombic dodecahedron is a convex polyhedron with 12 congruent rhombi as its faces.
- The rhombic triacontahedron is a convex polyhedron with 30 golden rhombi (rhombi whose diagonals are in the golden ratio) as its faces.
- The great rhombic triacontahedron is a nonconvex isohedral, isotoxal polyhedron with 30 intersecting rhombic faces.
- The rhombic hexecontahedron is a stellation of the rhombic triacontahedron. It is nonconvex with 60 golden rhombic faces with icosahedral symmetry.
- The rhombic enneacontahedron is a polyhedron composed of 90 rhombic faces, with three, five, or six rhombi meeting at each vertex. It has 60 broad rhombi and 30 slim ones.
- The rhombic icosahedron is a polyhedron composed of 20 rhombic faces, of which three, four, or five meet at each vertex. It has 10 faces on the polar axis with 10 faces following the equator.

Example polyhedra with all rhombic faces
Isohedral		Isohedral golden rhombi		2-isohedral	3-isohedral
Trigonal trapezohedron	Rhombic dodecahedron	Rhombic triacontahedron	Rhombic icosahedron	Rhombic enneacontahedron	Rhombohedron

== See also ==
- Rhombus of Michaelis, in human anatomy
- Rhomboid, either a parallelepiped or a parallelogram that is neither a rhombus nor a rectangle
- Rhombic antenna
- Rhombic Chess
- Flag of the Department of North Santander of Colombia, containing four stars in the shape of a rhombus
- Superellipse (includes a rhombus with rounded corners)
