= Rhombic icosahedron =

Polyhedron with 20 rhombic faces

- Type: Zonohedron
- Faces: 20 congruent golden rhombi
- Edges: 40
- Vertices: 22
- Symmetry group: D_{5d} = D_{5v}, [2^{+},10], (2*5)
- Properties: convex

A rhombic icosahedron

A rhombic icosahedron

The rhombic icosahedron is a polyhedron shaped like an oblate sphere. Its 20 faces are congruent golden rhombi; 3, 4, or 5 faces meet at each vertex. It has 5 faces (green on top figure) meeting at each of its 2 poles; these 2 vertices lie on its axis of 5-fold symmetry, which is perpendicular to 5 axes of 2-fold symmetry through the midpoints of opposite equatorial edges (example on top figure: most left-hand and most right-hand mid-edges). Its other 10 faces follow its equator, 5 above and 5 below it; each of these 10 rhombi has 2 of its 4 sides lying on this zig-zag skew decagon equator. The rhombic icosahedron has 22 vertices. It has D_{5d}, [2^{+},10], (2*5) symmetry group, of order 20; thus it has a center of symmetry (since 5 is odd).

Even though all its faces are congruent, the rhombic icosahedron is not face-transitive, since one can distinguish whether a particular face is near the equator or near a pole by examining the types of vertices surrounding this face.

== Zonohedron ==
The rhombic icosahedron is a zonohedron.

The rhombic icosahedron has 5 sets of 8 parallel edges, described as 8_{5} belts.

The edges of the rhombic icosahedron can be grouped in 5 parallel-sets, seen in this wireframe orthogonal projection.

The rhombic icosahedron forms the convex hull of the vertex-first projection of a 5-cube to 3 dimensions. The 32 vertices of a 5-cube map into the 22 exterior vertices of the rhombic icosahedron, with the remaining 10 interior vertices forming a pentagonal antiprism.

In the same way, one can obtain a Rhombic dodecahedron from a 4-cube, and a rhombic triacontahedron from a 6-cube.

== Related polyhedra ==
The rhombic icosahedron can be derived from the rhombic triacontahedron by removing a belt of 10 middle faces with parallel edges.

A rhombic triacontahedron can be seen as an elongated rhombic icosahedron.	The rhombic icosahedron and the rhombic triacontahedron have the same 10-fold symmetric orthogonal projection. (*)

(*) (For example, on the left-hand figure):

The orthogonal projection of the (vertical) belt of 10 middle faces of the rhombic triacontahedron is just the (horizontal) exterior regular decagon of the common orthogonal projection.

Removal of a further belt of 8 faces with parallel edges from the icosahedron results in the Bilinski dodecahedron, which is topologically equivalent but not congruent to the regular rhombic dodecahedron.
