= Roger von Oech =

American speaker, author and toymaker

- Roger von Oech with the Ball of Whacks, presenting at a creativity seminar in London (2008)
- Born: Roger von Oech; February 16, 1948 (age 78); Columbus, Ohio, United States
- Education: B.A. Ohio State, Ph.D. Stanford University
- Occupations: Creativity theorist, writer, speaker, consultant, and inventor
- Website: creativethink.com

Roger von Oech (born February 16, 1948) is an American speaker, conference organizer, author, and toy-maker whose focus has been on the study of creativity.

== Professional life ==
In 1975, von Oech earned his Ph.D. from Stanford University in the self-created interdisciplinary program "History of Ideas". Shortly afterwards, he began providing services in creativity consulting, working with companies such as Apple, IBM, Disney, Sony, and Intel.

In the 1980s, he created and produced the "Innovation in Industry" conference series in Palo Alto, which included Silicon Valley entrepreneurs such as Steve Jobs, Bill Gates, Bob Metcalfe, Charles Schwab, Alan Kay, and Nolan Bushnell of Atari.

== Decks ==
=== Creative Whack Pack ===
In 1988, von Oech created the Creative Whack Pack, a deck of 64 cards with illustrations and strategies for stimulating creativity. It was designed to be a portable version of his creativity workshops, and it has sold over a million copies.

== Creative Whack Company ==
In 2004, he started the Creative Whack company. Roger's definition of 'whack' is creativity.

== Geometric Toys ==
=== Ball of Whacks ===
The Ball of Whacks consists of 30 rhombic pyramid shaped magnetic blocks. These pieces combine to form a rhombic triacontahedron. They can be combined to form many other shapes. The Ball of Whacks comes with a creativity guidebook that gives instructions on using the product. There are three single-color versions made with either red, blue, or black pieces; and one six-color version with black, white, yellow, green, blue, and red pieces.

=== X-Ball ===
The X-Ball consists of 30 X-shaped pieces that connect together to form a skeletal icosidodecahedron. The X-Ball comes with a guidebook and in the color red.

=== Y-Ball ===
The Y-Ball consists of 30 Y-shaped pieces that when put together, form a truncated icosahedron. The Y-Ball comes in the color blue.

=== Star Ball ===
The Star Ball consists of 16 five-legged "star pieces" and 16 three legged "tri" pieces. These combine to form a skeletal rhombic triacontahedron. The pieces have polarity dots to help the user connect the right sides together. The Star Ball comes in Yellow.

=== Eureka Ball ===
The Eureka Ball consists of 12 magnetic design pieces , each a seven-sided, truncated pentagonal pyramid. Together, these Eureka pieces form a beautiful 12-sided dodecahedron. The Eureka Ball also has polarity dots on its pieces to help the user connect them together correctly. The Eureka Ball comes in Red.

== Books ==
- A Whack on the Side of the Head: How You Can Be More Creative (1st ed. 1983, 4th ed. 2008, trans. into 22 languages)
- A Kick in the Seat of the Pants: Using Your Explorer, Artist, Judge, and Warrior to Be More Creative (1986)
- Expect the Unexpected, or You Won't Find It: A Creativity Tool Based on the Ancient Wisdom of Heraclitus (2001)
