= Rhombic triacontahedron =

Catalan solid with 30 faces

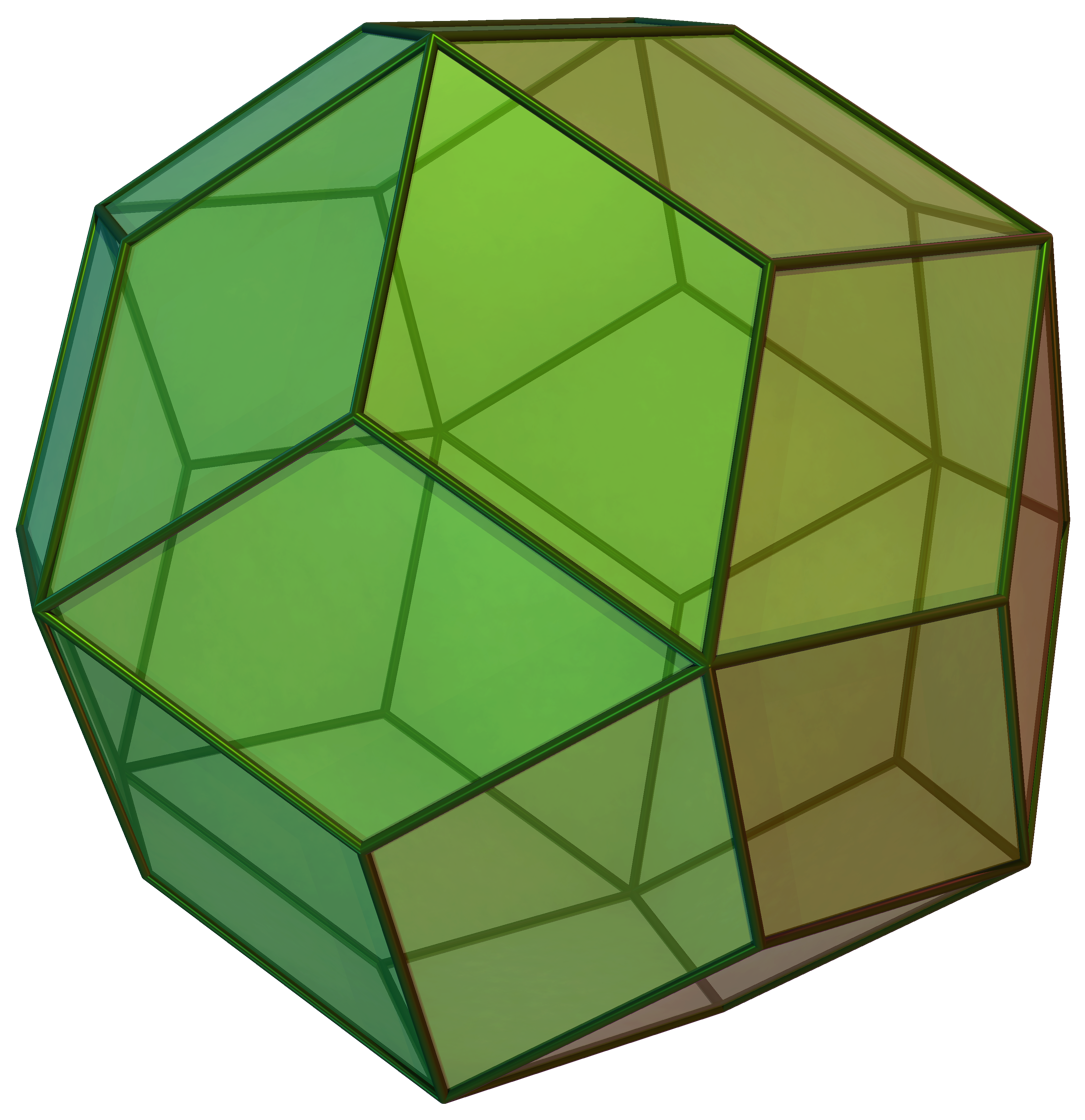
- Type: Catalan solid
- Faces: 30
- Edges: 60
- Vertices: 32
- Conway notation: jI
- Symmetry group: icosahedral symmetry $\mathrm{I}_\mathrm{h}$
- Dihedral angle (degrees): 144°
- Dual polyhedron: Icosidodecahedron
- Properties: convex, isohedral, isotoxal, zonohedron

Net

The rhombic triacontahedron, sometimes simply called the triacontahedron as it is the most common thirty-faced polyhedron, is a convex polyhedron with 30 rhombic faces. It has 60 edges and 32 vertices of two types. It is a Catalan solid, and the dual polyhedron of the icosidodecahedron. It is a zonohedron and can be seen as an elongated rhombic icosahedron.

A face of the rhombic triacontahedron; the lengths of the diagonals are in the golden ratio.

A cube is transformed into a rhombic triacontahedron by dividing its square faces into 4 rhombs and splitting middle edges into new rhombic faces.

The ratio of the long diagonal to the short diagonal of each face is exactly equal to the golden ratio, φ, so that the acute angles on each face measure 2 arctan(1/φ) = arctan(2), or approximately 63.43°. A rhombus so obtained is called a golden rhombus.

Being the dual of an Archimedean solid, the rhombic triacontahedron is face-transitive, meaning the symmetry group of the solid acts transitively on the set of faces. This means that for any two faces, A and B, there is a rotation or reflection of the solid that leaves it occupying the same region of space while moving face A to face B.

The rhombic triacontahedron is somewhat special in being one of the nine edge-transitive convex polyhedra, the others being the five Platonic solids, the cuboctahedron, the icosidodecahedron, and the rhombic dodecahedron.

The rhombic triacontahedron is also interesting in that its vertices include the arrangement of four Platonic solids. It contains ten tetrahedra, five cubes, an icosahedron and a dodecahedron. The centers of the faces contain five octahedra.

It can be constructed by attaching a right triangular pyramid to each face of a regular icosahedron, of a height such that the adjacent faces of different pyramids are coplanar. It can also be made from a truncated octahedron by dividing the hexagonal faces into three rhombi:

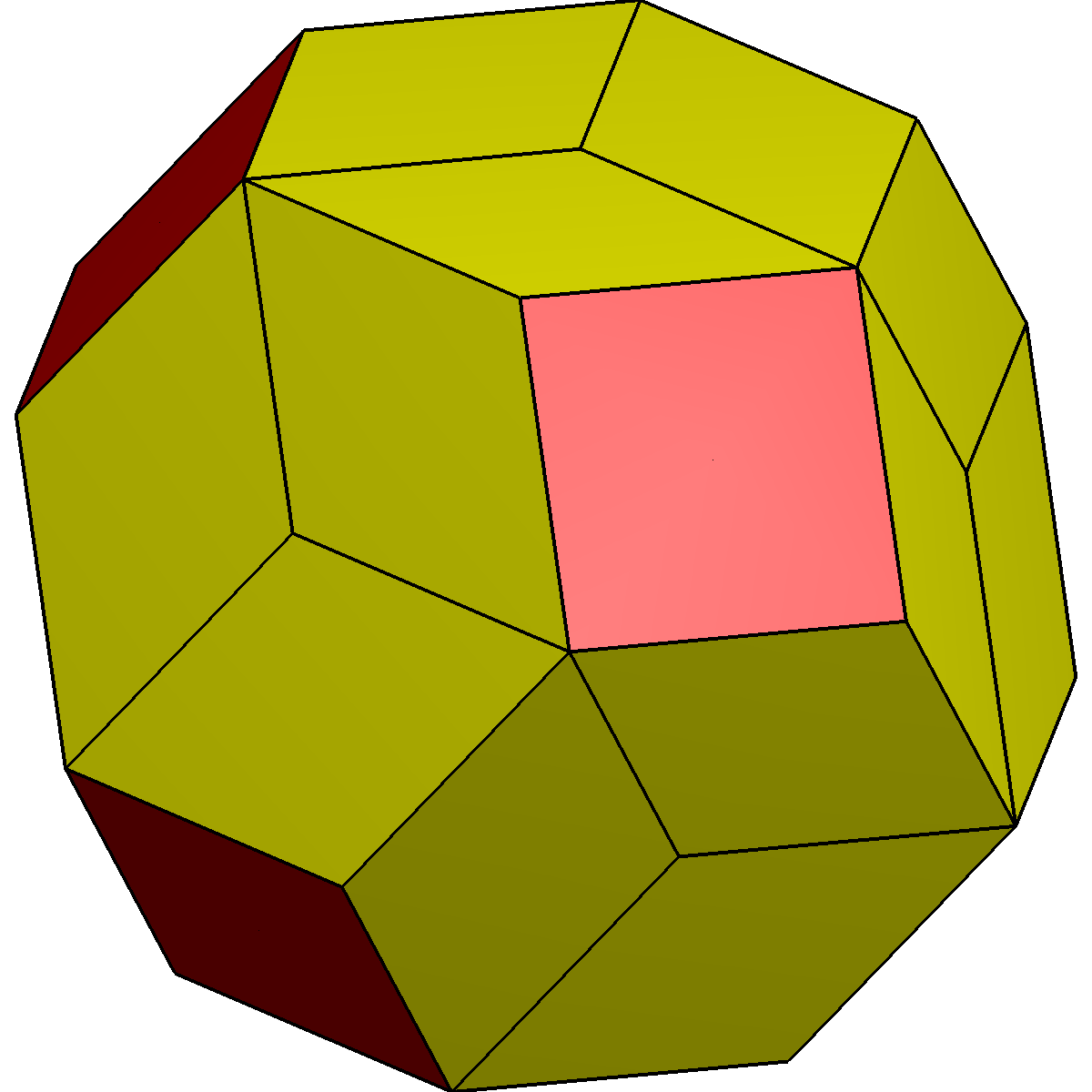
A topological rhombic triacontahedron in a truncated octahedron

== Cartesian coordinates ==
Let φ be the golden ratio. The 12 points given by (0, ±1, ±φ) and cyclic permutations of these coordinates are the vertices of a regular icosahedron. Its dual regular dodecahedron, whose edges intersect those of the icosahedron at right angles, has as vertices the 8 points (±1, ±1, ±1) together with the 12 points (0, ±φ, ±1/φ) and cyclic permutations of these coordinates. All 32 points together are the vertices of a rhombic triacontahedron centered at the origin. The length of its edges is √3 – φ ≈ 1.17557050458. Its faces have diagonals with lengths 2 and 2/φ.

== Dimensions ==
3D model of a rhombic triacontahedron

If the edge length of a rhombic triacontahedron is a, surface area, volume, the radius of an inscribed sphere (tangent to each of the rhombic triacontahedron's faces) and midradius, which touches the middle of each edge are:

$$\begin{align}
S &= 12\sqrt{5}\,a^2 &&\approx 26.8328 a^2 \\[6px]
V &= 4\sqrt{5+2\sqrt{5}}\,a^3 &&\approx 12.3107 a^3 \\[6px]
r_\mathrm{i} &= \frac{\varphi^2}{\sqrt{1 + \varphi^2}}\,a = \sqrt{1 + \frac{2}{\sqrt{5}}}\,a &&\approx 1.37638 a \\[6px]
r_\mathrm{m} &= \left(1+\frac{1}{\sqrt{5}}\right)\,a &&\approx 1.44721 a
\end{align}$$

where φ is the golden ratio.

The insphere is tangent to the faces at their face centroids. Short diagonals belong only to the edges of the inscribed regular dodecahedron, while long diagonals are included only in edges of the inscribed icosahedron.

== Dissection ==
The rhombic triacontahedron can be dissected into 20 golden rhombohedra: 10 acute ones and 10 obtuse ones.

10	10
Acute form	Obtuse form

== Orthogonal projections ==
The rhombic triacontahedron has four symmetry positions, two centered on vertices, one mid-face, and one mid-edge. Embedded in projection "10" are the "fat" rhombus and "skinny" rhombus which tile together to produce the non-periodic tessellation often referred to as Penrose tiling.

Orthogonal projections
Projective symmetry	[2]	[2]	[6]	[10]
Image				
Dual image				

== Stellations ==
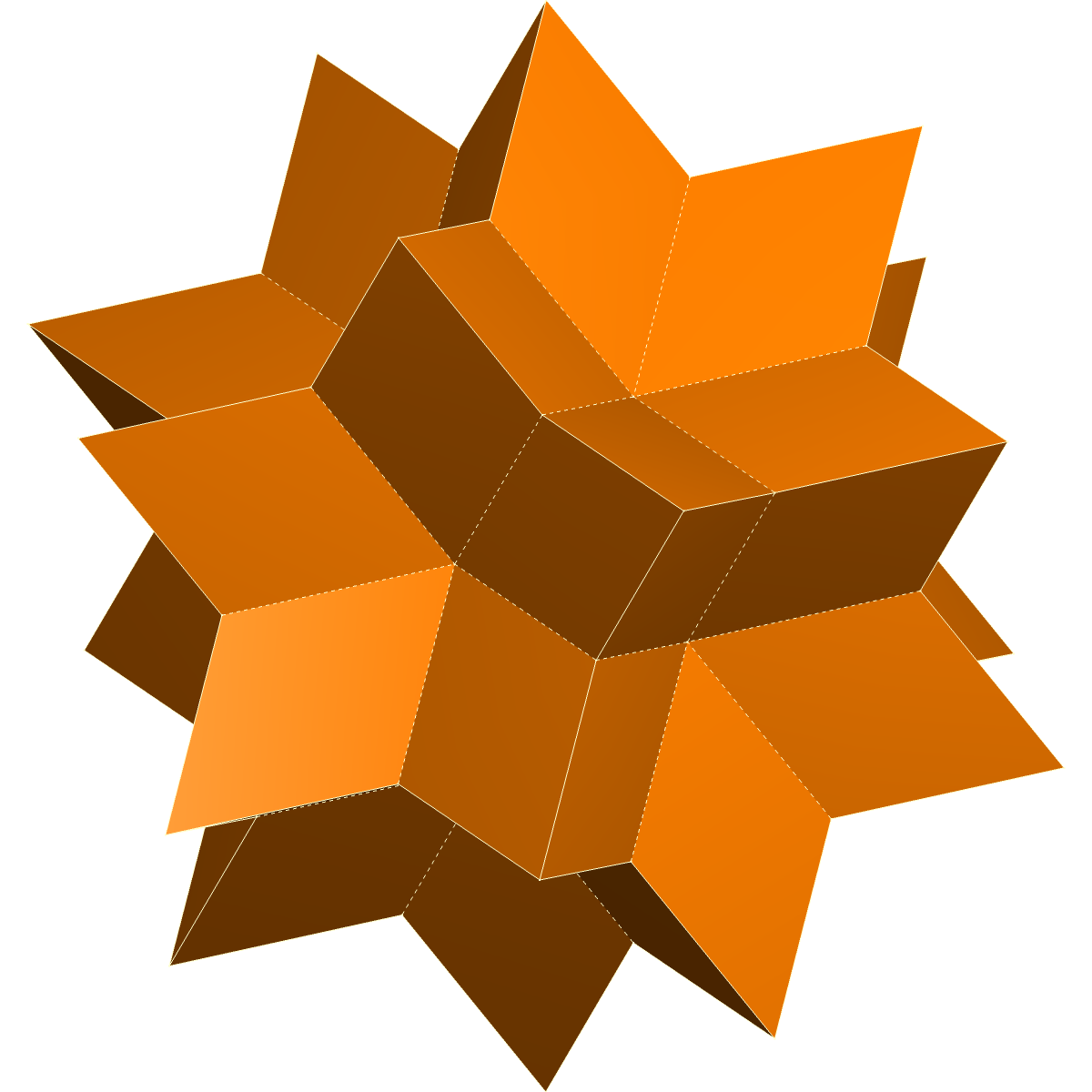
Rhombic hexecontahedron

Example of stellations of the rhombic triacontahedron

The rhombic triacontahedron has 227 fully supported stellations. One of the stellations of the rhombic triacontahedron is the compound of five cubes, which is represents a regular compound polyhedron. The total number of stellations of the rhombic triacontahedron is 358833097.

In Dual Models, Magnus Wenninger describes stellations to infinity, hemipolyhedral duals of which the rhombic triacontahedron is the convex hull of three (the small icosihemidodecacron, great dodecahemidodecacron, great dodecahemicosacron). Their boundless faces and edges as elongated prisms or pyramids are orthogonal to the central planes and faces of their dual hemipolyhedra; the coincidental figures of these formed by their corresponding dual hemipolyhedra also have the rhombic triacontahedron as their convex hull.

== Related polyhedra ==
Family of uniform icosahedral polyhedra
Symmetry: [5,3], (*532)							[5,3]^{+}, (532)
{5,3}	t{5,3}	r{5,3}	t{3,5}	{3,5}	rr{5,3}	tr{5,3}	sr{5,3}
Duals to uniform polyhedra
V5.5.5	V3.10.10	V3.5.3.5	V5.6.6	V3.3.3.3.3	V3.4.5.4	V4.6.10	V3.3.3.3.5

This polyhedron is a part of a sequence of rhombic polyhedra and tilings with [n, 3] Coxeter group symmetry. The cube can be seen as a rhombic hexahedron where the rhombi are also rectangles.

Symmetry mutations of dual quasiregular tilings: V(3.n)^{2}
*n32	Spherical			Euclidean	Hyperbolic		
*n32	*332	*432	*532	*632	*732	*832...	*∞32
Tiling							
Conf.	V(3.3)^{2}	V(3.4)^{2}	V(3.5)^{2}	V(3.6)^{2}	V(3.7)^{2}	V(3.8)^{2}	V(3.∞)^{2}

Spherical rhombic triacontahedron

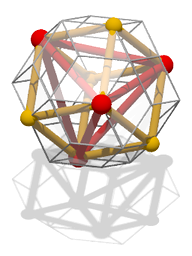
A rhombic triacontahedron with an inscribed tetrahedron (red) and cube (yellow).
(Rotating model)

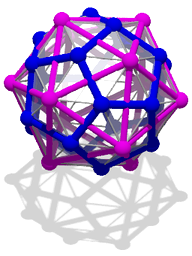
A rhombic triacontahedron with an inscribed dodecahedron (blue) and icosahedron (purple).
Rotating model)

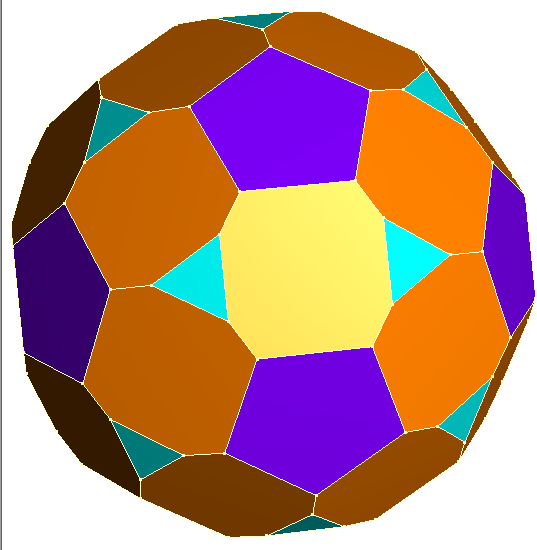
Fully truncated rhombic triacontahedron

== Uses ==
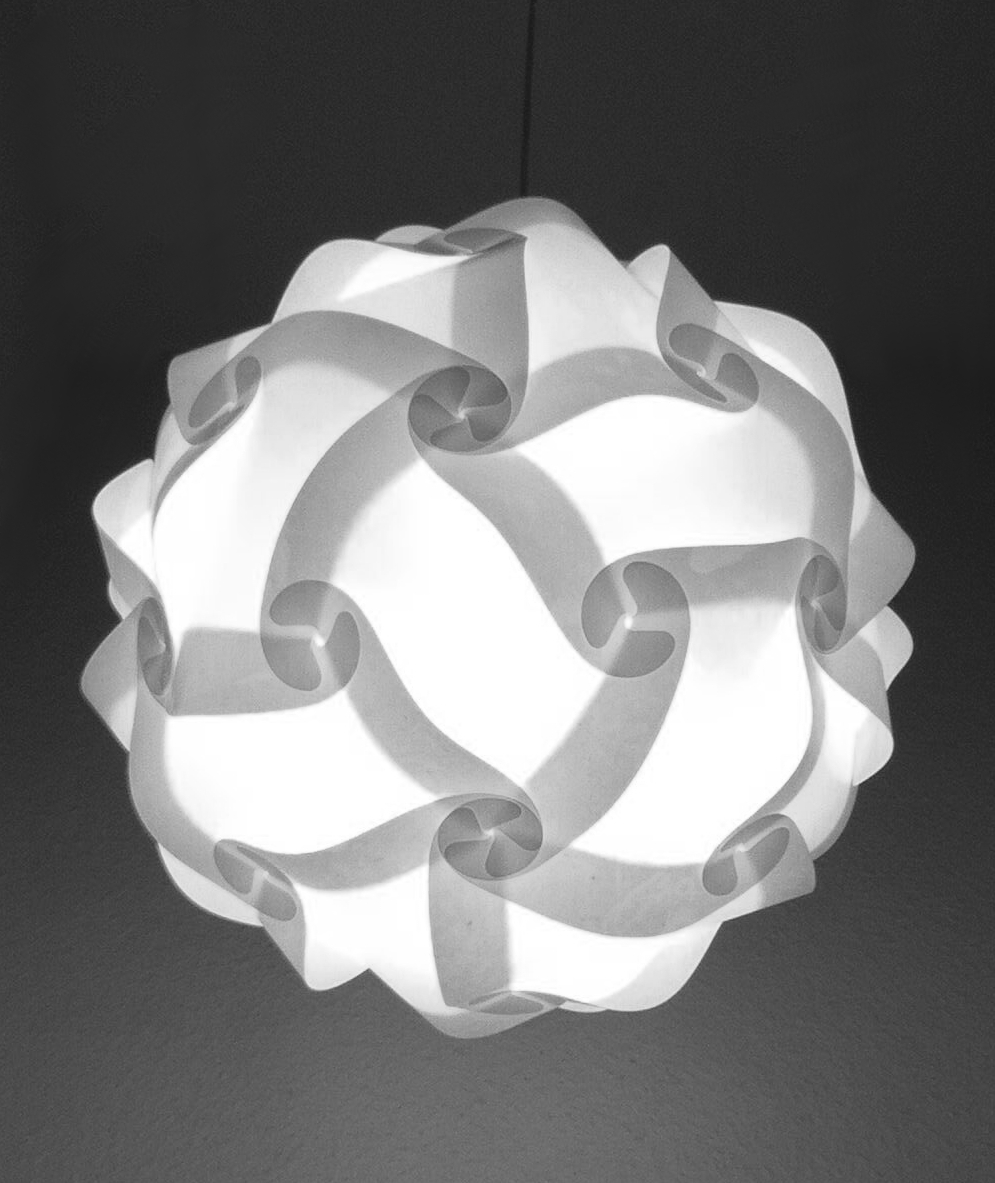
An example of the use of a rhombic triacontahedron in the design of a lamp.

STL model of a rhombic triacontahedral box made of six panels around a cubic hole – zoom into the model to see the hole from the inside.

Danish designer Holger Strøm uses the rhombic triacontahedron as a basis for the design of his buildable lamp IQ-light (IQ for "interlocking quadrilaterals").

Woodworker Jane Kostick builds boxes in the shape of a rhombic triacontahedron. The simple construction is based on the less than obvious relationship between the rhombic triacontahedron and the cube.

Roger von Oech's "Ball of Whacks" comes in the shape of a rhombic triacontahedron.

The rhombic triacontahedron is used as the "d30" thirty-sided die, sometimes useful in some roleplaying games or other places.

== See also ==
- Golden rhombus
- Rhombille tiling
- Truncated rhombic triacontahedron
