= Rhombic dodecahedron =

Catalan solid with 12 faces

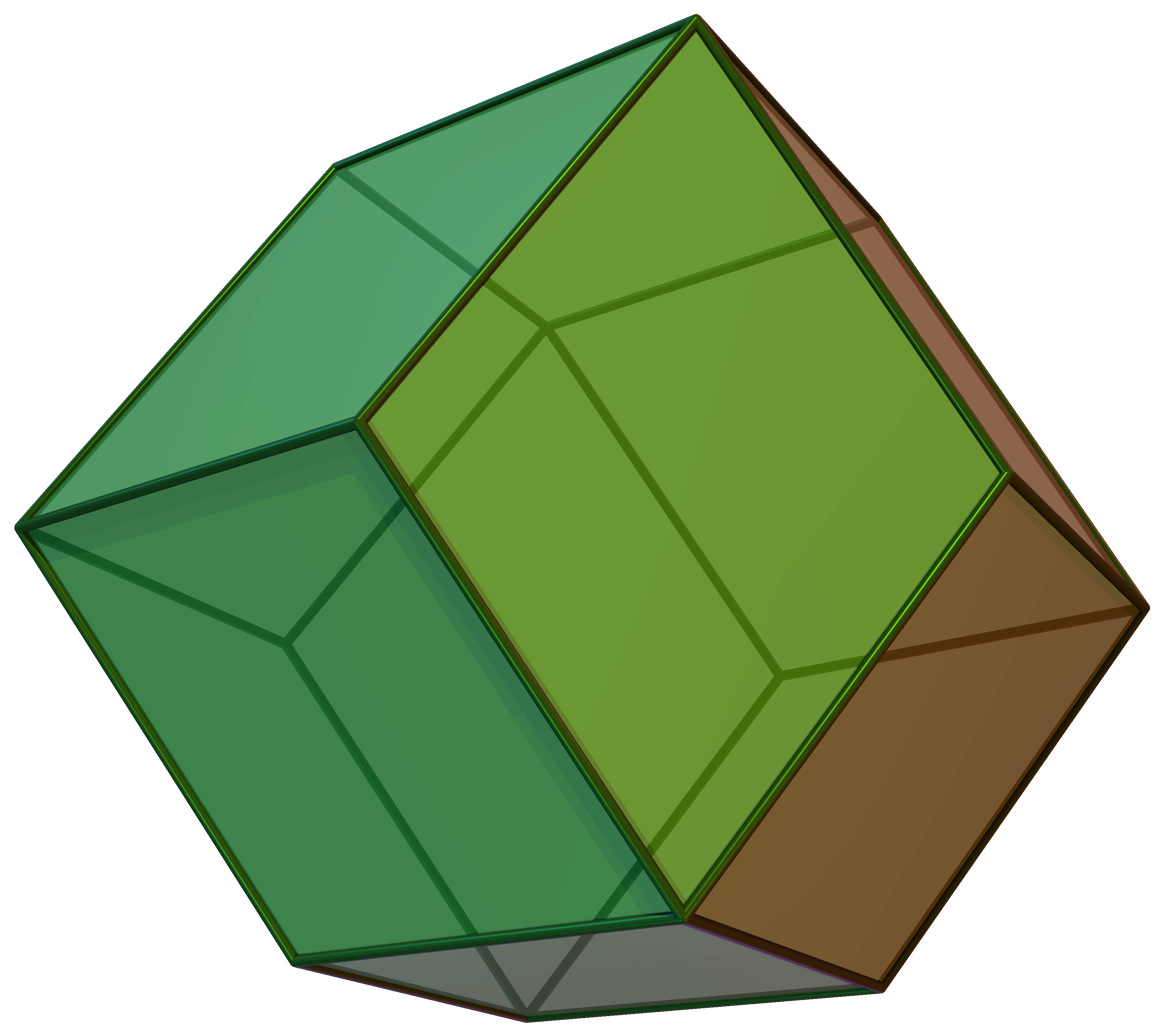
- Type: Catalan solid, Parallelohedron
- Faces: 12 rhombi
- Edges: 24
- Vertices: 14
- Conway notation: jC
- Symmetry group: octahedral symmetry $\mathrm{O}_h$
- Dihedral angle (degrees): 120°
- Dual polyhedron: cuboctahedron
- Properties: convex, edge-transitive, face-transitive

Net

3D model of a rhombic dodecahedron

In geometry, the rhombic dodecahedron is a convex polyhedron with 12 congruent rhombic faces. It has 24 edges, and 14 vertices of 2 types. As a Catalan solid, it is the dual polyhedron of the cuboctahedron. As a parallelohedron, the rhombic dodecahedron can be used to tesselate its copies in space creating a rhombic dodecahedral honeycomb. There are some variations of the rhombic dodecahedron, one of which is the Bilinski dodecahedron. There are some stellations of the rhombic dodecahedron, one of which is the Escher's solid. The rhombic dodecahedron may also appear in nature (such as in the garnet crystal), the architectural philosophies, practical usages, and toys.

== As a Catalan solid ==
=== Metric properties ===
The rhombic dodecahedron is a polyhedron with twelve rhombi, each of which long face-diagonal length is exactly $\sqrt{2}$ times the short face-diagonal length and the acute angle measurement is $\arccos(1/3) \approx 70.53^\circ$. Its dihedral angle between two rhombi is 120°.

The rhombic dodecahedron is a Catalan solid, meaning the dual polyhedron of an Archimedean solid, the cuboctahedron; they share the same symmetry, the octahedral symmetry. It is face-transitive, meaning the symmetry group of the solid acts transitively on its set of faces. In elementary terms, this means that for any two faces, there is a rotation or reflection of the solid that leaves it occupying the same region of space while moving a face to another one. Other than rhombic triacontahedron, it is one of two Catalan solids that each have the property that their isometry groups are edge-transitive; the other convex polyhedron classes being the five Platonic solids and the other two Archimedean solids: its dual polyhedron and icosidodecahedron.

Denoting by $a$ the edge length of a rhombic dodecahedron,

- the radius of its inscribed sphere (a sphere that is tangent to each of the rhombic dodecahedron's faces) is: (OEIS: A157697)
  $$r_\mathrm{i} = \frac{\sqrt{6}}{3}a \approx 0.817a,$$
- the radius of its midsphere is: OEIS: A179587)
  $$r_\mathrm{m} = \frac{2\sqrt{2}}{3}a \approx 0.943a,$$
- the radius of the sphere passing through the six order four vertices, but not through the eight order 3 vertices, is: (OEIS: A020832)
  $$r_\mathrm{o} = \frac{2\sqrt{3}}{3}a \approx 1.155a,$$
- the radius of the sphere passing through the eight order three vertices is exactly equal to the length of the sides: $r_\mathrm{t} = a$

The surface area $A$ and the volume $V$ of a rhombic dodecahedron with edge length $a$ are:
$$\begin{align}
A &= 8\sqrt{2}a^2 &\approx 11.314a^2, \\
V &= \frac{16\sqrt{3}}{9}a^3 &\approx 3.079a^3.
\end{align}$$

The rhombic dodecahedron can be viewed as the convex hull of the union of the vertices of a cube and a regular octahedron, where the edges intersect perpendicularly. The six vertices where four rhombi meet correspond to the vertices of the octahedron, while the eight vertices where three rhombi meet correspond to the vertices of the cube.

The skeleton of a rhombic dodecahedron is called a rhombic dodecahedral graph, with 14 vertices and 24 edges. It is the Levi graph of the Miquel configuration (8_{3} 6_{4}).

=== Construction ===
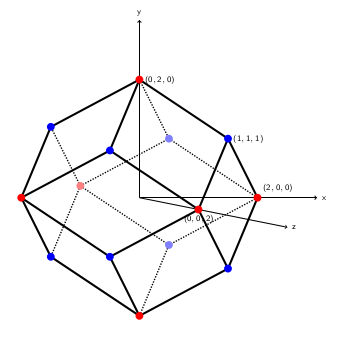
Image of the rhombic dodecahedron given by the points with coordinates (±1, ±1, ±1), (±2, 0, 0), (0, ±2, 0) and (0, 0, ±2).

Pyritohedron variations between a cube and a rhombic dodecahedron. Halfway in the transition, the polyhedron becomes a Regular Dodecahedron.

Construction of rhombic dodecahedron by inverting the center-face-pyramids of a cube

For edge length $\sqrt{3}$, the eight vertices where three faces meet at their obtuse angles have Cartesian coordinates (±1, ±1, ±1). In the case of the coordinates of the six vertices where four faces meet at their acute angles, they are (±2, 0, 0), (0, ±2, 0) and (0, 0, ±2).

The rhombic dodecahedron can be seen as a degenerate limiting case of a pyritohedron, with permutation of coordinates (±1, ±1, ±1) and (0, 1 + h, 1 − h^{2}) with parameter h = 1.

These coordinates illustrate that a rhombic dodecahedron can be seen as a cube with six square pyramids attached to each face, allowing them to fit together into a cube. Therefore, the rhombic dodecahedron has twice the volume of the inscribed cube with edges equal to the short diagonals of the rhombi. Alternatively, the rhombic dodecahedron can be constructed by inverting six square pyramids until their apices meet at the cube's center.

== As a space-filling polyhedron ==
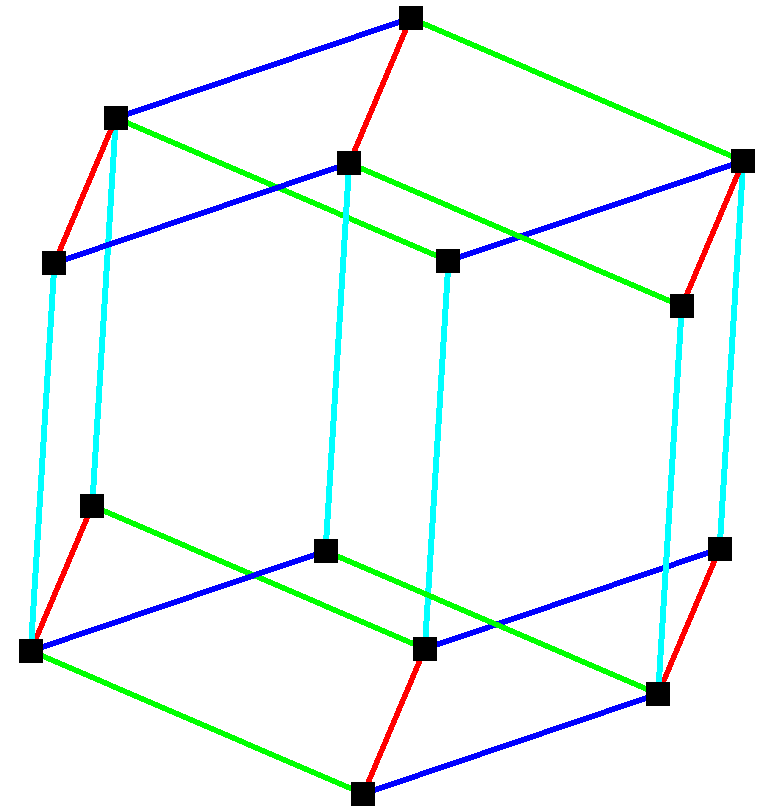
The rhombic dodecahedron as a parallelohedron

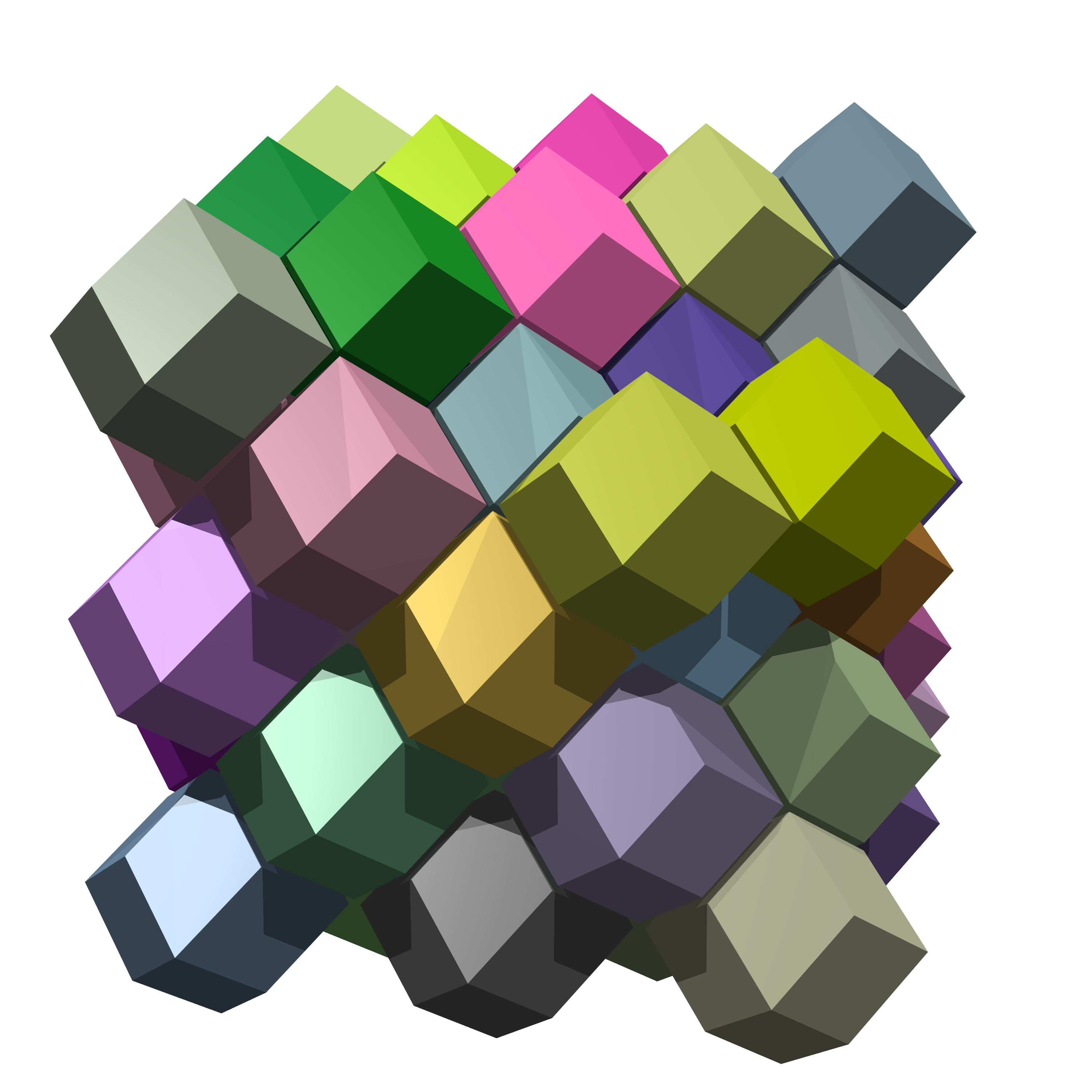
The rhombic dodecahedron can tessellate space by translational copies of itself

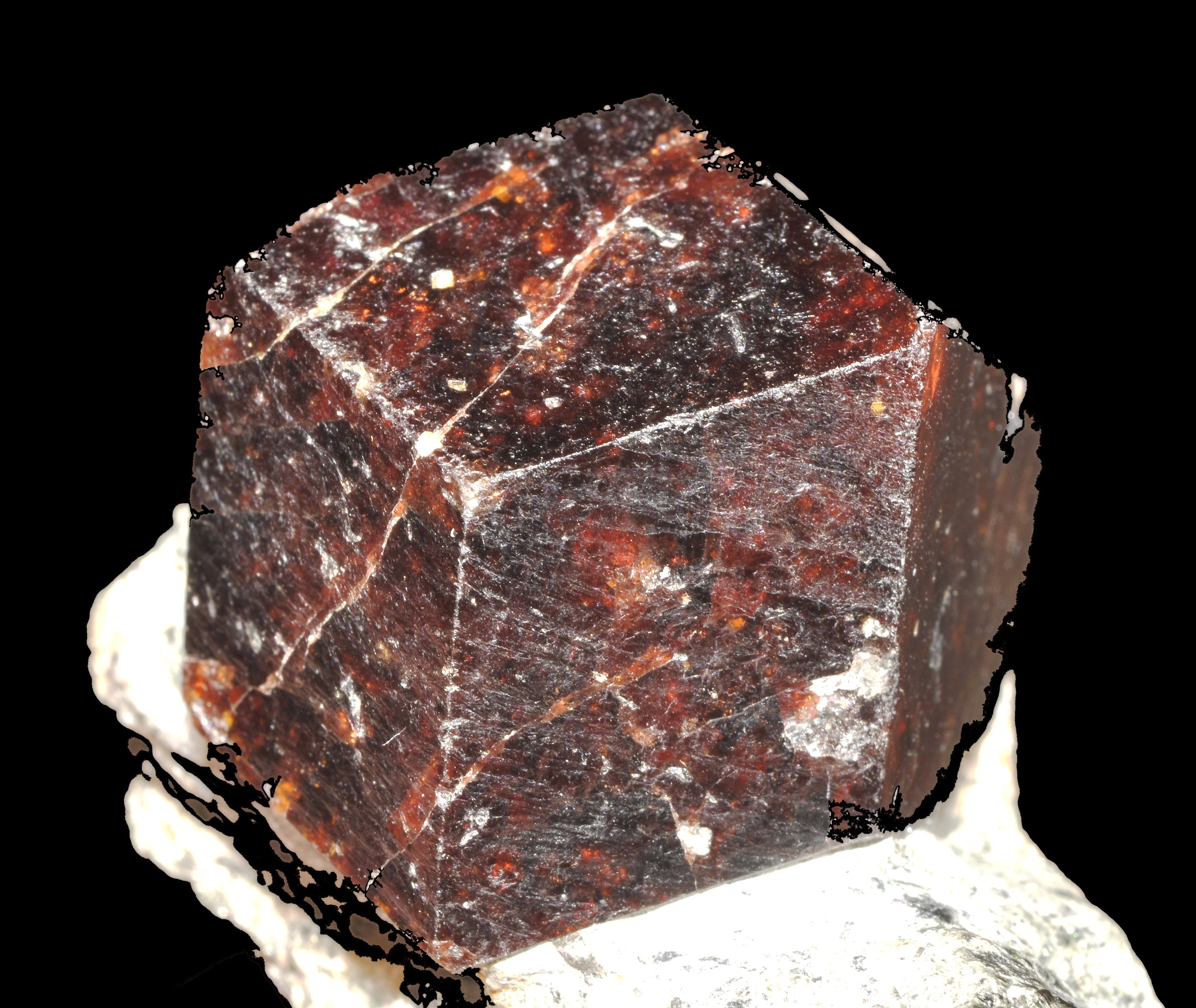
A garnet crystal

The honeycomb can be derived from an alternate cube tessellation by augmenting each face of each cube with a pyramid

The rhombic dodecahedron is a space-filling polyhedron, meaning it can be applied to tessellate three-dimensional space: it can be stacked to fill a space, much like hexagons fill a plane. It is a parallelohedron because it can be space-filling a honeycomb in which all of its copies meet face-to-face. More generally, every parellelohedron is zonohedron, a centrally symmetric polyhedron with centrally symmetric faces. As a parallelohedron, the rhombic dodecahedron can be constructed with four sets of six parallel edges.

The rhombic dodecahedral honeycomb (or dodecahedrille) is an example of a honeycomb constructed by filling all rhombic dodecahedra. It is dual to the tetroctahedrille or half cubic honeycomb, and it is described by two Coxeter diagrams: and. With D_{3d} symmetry, it can be seen as an elongated trigonal trapezohedron. It can be seen as the Voronoi tessellation of the face-centered cubic lattice. It is the Brillouin zone of body-centered cubic (bcc) crystals. Some minerals such, as garnet, form a rhombic dodecahedral crystal habit. As Johannes Kepler noted in his 1611 book on snowflakes (Strena seu de Nive Sexangula), honey bees use the geometry of rhombic dodecahedra to form honeycombs from a tessellation of cells, each of which is a hexagonal prism capped with half a rhombic dodecahedron. The rhombic dodecahedron also appears in the unit cells of diamond and diamondoids. In these cases, four vertices (alternate threefold ones) are absent, but the chemical bonds lie on the remaining edges.

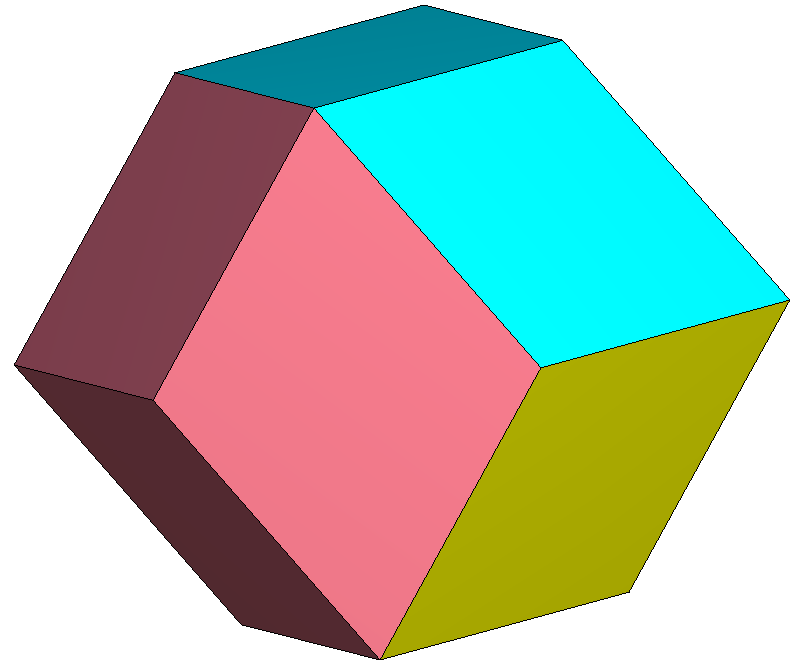
Dissection of the rhombic dodecahedron analogous to that of the hexagon

A rhombic dodecahedron can be dissected into four congruent, obtuse trigonal trapezohedra around its center. These rhombohedra are the cells of a trigonal trapezohedral honeycomb. Analogously, a regular hexagon can be dissected into 3 rhombi around its center. These rhombi are the tiles of a rhombille.

== Applications ==
=== Practical usage ===
In spacecraft reaction wheel layout, a tetrahedral configuration of four wheels is commonly used. For wheels that perform equally (from a peak torque and max angular momentum standpoint) in both spin directions and across all four wheels, the maximum torque and maximum momentum envelopes for the 3-axis attitude control system (considering idealized actuators) are given by projecting the tesseract representing the limits of each wheel's torque or momentum into 3D space via the 3 × 4 matrix of wheel axes; the resulting 3D polyhedron is a rhombic dodecahedron. Such an arrangement of reaction wheels is not the only possible configuration (a simpler arrangement consists of three wheels mounted to spin about orthogonal axes), but it is advantageous in providing redundancy to mitigate the failure of one of the four wheels (with degraded overall performance available from the remaining three active wheels) and in providing a more convex envelope than a cube, which leads to less agility dependence on axis direction (from an actuator/plant standpoint). Spacecraft mass properties influence overall system momentum and agility, so decreased variance in envelope boundary does not necessarily lead to increased uniformity in preferred axis biases (that is, even with a perfectly distributed performance limit within the actuator subsystem, preferred rotation axes are not necessarily arbitrary at the system level).

The polyhedron is also the basis for the HEALPix grid, used in cosmology for storing and manipulating maps of the cosmic microwave background, and in computer graphics for storing environment maps.

=== Miscellaneous ===
The collections of the Louvre include a die in the shape of a rhombic dodecahedron dating from Ptolemaic Egypt. The faces are inscribed with Greek letters representing the numbers 1 through 12: Α Β Γ Δ Ε Ϛ Z Η Θ Ι ΙΑ ΙΒ. The function of the die is unknown.

== Other related figures ==
=== Topologically equivalent forms ===
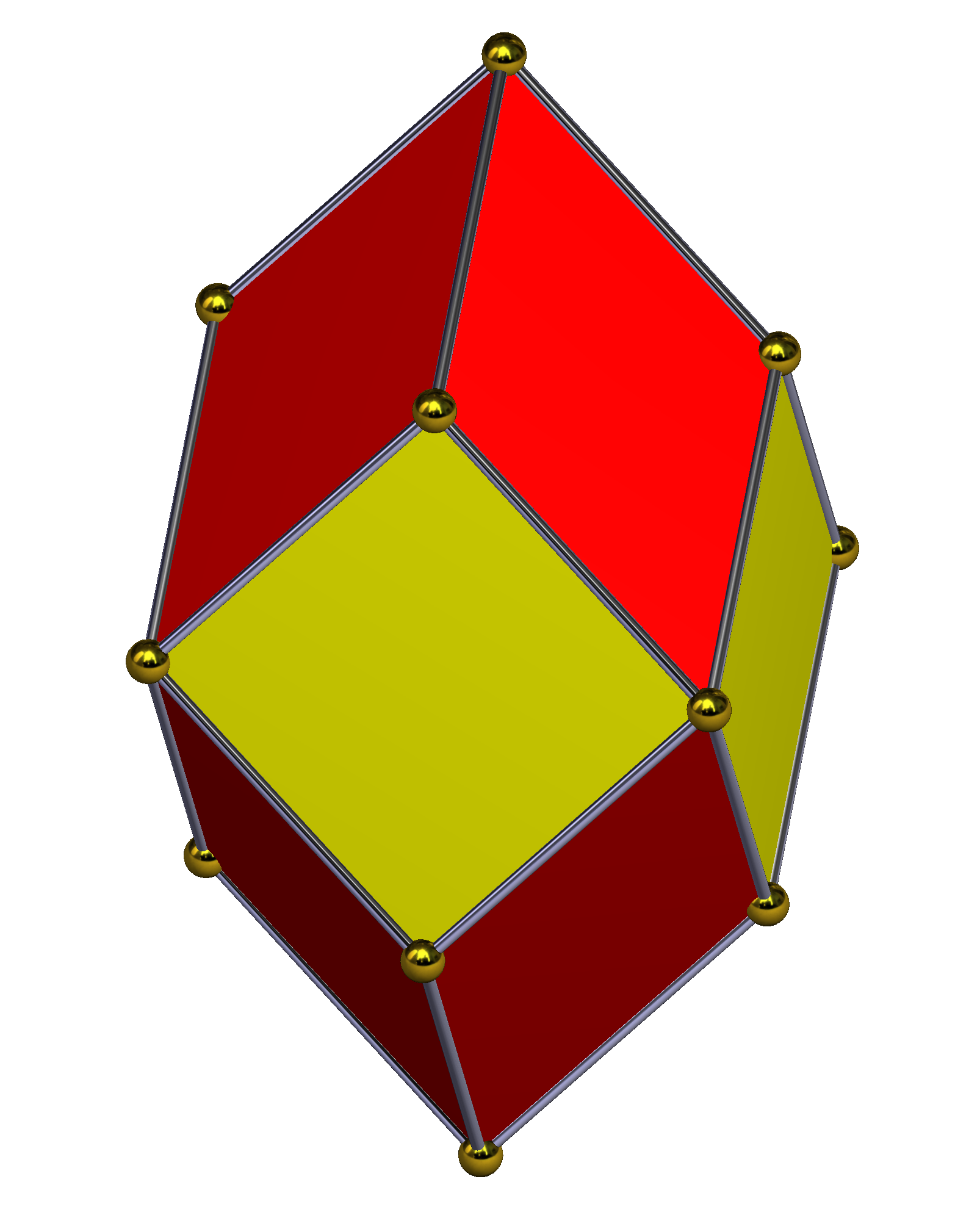
A rhombic dodecahedron but with square and rhombic faces

The Bilinski dodecahedron

Other symmetry constructions of the rhombic dodecahedron are also space-filling, and as parallelotopes they are similar to variations of space-filling truncated octahedra. For example, with 4 square faces, and 60-degree rhombic faces, and D_{4h} dihedral symmetry, order 16. It can be seen as a cuboctahedron with square pyramids attached on the top and bottom.

In 1960, Stanko Bilinski discovered a second rhombic dodecahedron with 12 congruent rhombus faces, the Bilinski dodecahedron. It has the same topology but different geometry. The rhombic faces in this form have the golden ratio.

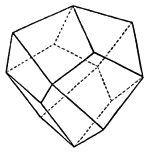
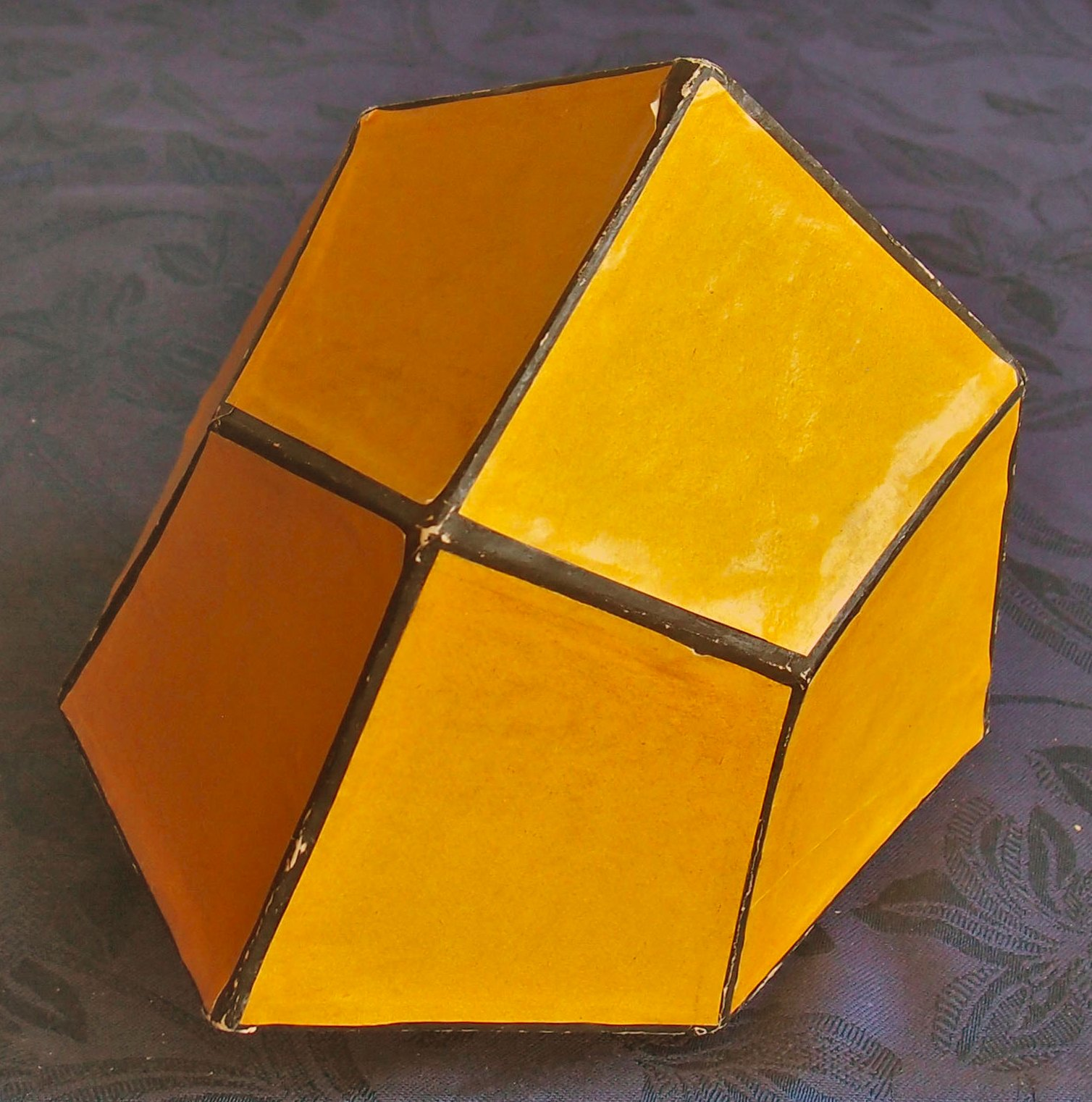
Drawing and crystal model of deltoidal dodecahedron

The deltoidal dodecahedron is another topological equivalence of a rhombic dodecahedron form. It is isohedral with tetrahedral symmetry order 24, distorting rhombic faces into kites (deltoids). It has 8 vertices adjusted in or out in alternate sets of 4, with the limiting case a tetrahedral envelope. Variations can be parametrized by (a,b), where b and a depend on each other such that the tetrahedron defined by the four vertices of a face has volume zero, i.e. is a planar face. (1,1) is the rhombic solution. As a approaches 1/2, b approaches infinity. It always holds that 1/a + 1/b = 2, with a, b > 1/2.

(±2, 0, 0), (0, ±2, 0), (0, 0, ±2)
(a, a, a), (−a, −a, a), (−a, a, −a), (a, −a, −a)
(−b, −b, −b), (−b, b, b), (b, −b, b), (b, b, −b)

| (1,1) | (7/8,7/6) | (3/4,3/2) | (2/3,2) | (5/8,5/2) | (9/16,9/2) |

=== Stellations ===
Some stellated rhombic dodecahedra

Like many convex polyhedra, the rhombic dodecahedron can be stellated by extending the faces or edges until they meet to form a new polyhedron. Several such stellations have been described by Dorman Luke. The first stellation, often called the stellated rhombic dodecahedron, can be seen as a rhombic dodecahedron with each face augmented by attaching a rhombic-based pyramid to it, with a pyramid height such that the sides lie in the face planes of the neighbouring faces. Luke describes four more stellations: the second and third stellations (expanding outwards), one formed by removing the second from the third, and another by adding the original rhombic dodecahedron back to the previous one.

=== Related polytope ===
In a perfect vertex-first projection two of the tesseract's vertices (marked in pale green) are projected exactly in the center of the rhombic dodecahedron

The rhombic dodecahedron forms the hull of the vertex-first projection of a tesseract to three dimensions. There are exactly two ways of decomposing a rhombic dodecahedron into four congruent rhombohedra, giving eight possible rhombohedra as projections of the tesseract's 8 cubic cells. One set of projective vectors are: u = (1,1,−1,−1), v = (−1,1,−1,1), w = (1,−1,−1,1).

The rhombic dodecahedron forms the maximal cross-section of a 24-cell, and also forms the hull of its vertex-first parallel projection into three dimensions. The rhombic dodecahedron can be decomposed into six congruent (but non-regular) square dipyramids meeting at a single vertex in the center; these form the images of six pairs of the 24-cell's octahedral cells. The remaining 12 octahedral cells project onto the faces of the rhombic dodecahedron. The non-regularity of these images are due to projective distortion; the facets of the 24-cell are regular octahedra in 4-space.

This decomposition gives an interesting method for constructing the rhombic dodecahedron: cut a cube into six congruent square pyramids, and attach them to the faces of a second cube. The triangular faces of each pair of adjacent pyramids lie on the same plane, and so merge into rhombi. The 24-cell may also be constructed in an analogous way using two tesseracts.

== See also ==
- Archimede construction systems
- Trapezo-rhombic dodecahedron
- Truncated rhombic dodecahedron
