= Zonohedron =

Convex polyhedron projected from hypercube

In geometry, a zonohedron is a convex polyhedron that is centrally symmetric, every face of which is a polygon that is centrally symmetric (a zonogon). Any zonohedron may equivalently be described as the Minkowski sum of a set of line segments in three-dimensional space, or as a three-dimensional projection of a hypercube. Zonohedra were originally defined and studied by E. S. Fedorov, a Russian crystallographer. A zonohedron is three-dimensional; in any dimension, the Minkowski sum of line segments forms a convex polytope known as a zonotope.

== Tiling space ==
The original motivation for studying zonohedra is that the Voronoi diagram of any lattice forms a convex uniform honeycomb in which the cells are zonohedra. Any zonohedron formed in this way can tessellate 3-dimensional space and is called a primary parallelohedron. Each primary parallelohedron is combinatorially equivalent to one of five types: the rhombohedron (including the cube), hexagonal prism, truncated octahedron, rhombic dodecahedron, and the rhombo-hexagonal dodecahedron.

== From Minkowski sums ==
A zonotope is the Minkowski sum of line segments. The sixteen dark-red points (on the right) form the Minkowski sum of the four non-convex sets (on the left), each of which consists of a pair of red points. Their convex hulls (shaded pink) contain plus-signs (+): The right plus-sign is the sum of the left plus-signs.

Let $\{v_0, v_1, \dots\}$ be a collection of three-dimensional vectors. With each vector $v_i$ we may associate a line segment $\{ x_i v_i \mid 0 \leq x_i \leq 1 \}$. The Minkowski sum $\{ \textstyle \sum_i x_i v_i \mid 0 \leq x_i \leq 1 \}$ forms a zonohedron, and all zonohedra that contain the origin have this form. The vectors from which the zonohedron is formed are called its generators. This characterization allows the definition of zonohedra to be generalized to higher dimensions, giving zonotopes.

Each edge in a zonohedron is parallel to at least one of the generators, and has length equal to the sum of the lengths of the generators to which it is parallel. Therefore, by choosing a set of generators with no parallel pairs of vectors, and by setting all vector lengths equal, we may form an equilateral version of any combinatorial type of zonohedron.

By choosing sets of vectors with high degrees of symmetry, we can form in this way, zonohedra with at least as much symmetry. For instance, generators equally spaced around the equator of a sphere, together with another pair of generators through the poles of the sphere, form zonohedra in the form of prism over regular $2k$-gons: the cube, hexagonal prism, octagonal prism, decagonal prism, dodecagonal prism, etc. Generators parallel to the edges of an octahedron form a truncated octahedron, and generators parallel to the long diagonals of a cube form a rhombic dodecahedron.

The Minkowski sum of any two zonohedra is another zonohedron, generated by the union of the generators of the two given zonohedra. Thus, the Minkowski sum of a cube and a truncated octahedron forms the truncated cuboctahedron, while the Minkowski sum of the cube and the rhombic dodecahedron forms the truncated rhombic dodecahedron. Both of these zonohedra are simple (three faces meet at each vertex), as is the truncated small rhombicuboctahedron formed from the Minkowski sum of the cube, truncated octahedron, and rhombic dodecahedron.

== From arrangements ==
The Gauss map of any convex polyhedron maps each face of the polygon to a point on the unit sphere, and maps each edge of the polygon separating a pair of faces to a great circle arc connecting the corresponding two points. In the case of a zonohedron, the edges surrounding each face can be grouped into pairs of parallel edges, and when translated via the Gauss map any such pair becomes a pair of contiguous segments on the same great circle. Thus, the edges of the zonohedron can be grouped into zones of parallel edges, which correspond to the segments of a common great circle on the Gauss map, and the 1-skeleton of the zonohedron can be viewed as the planar dual graph to an arrangement of great circles on the sphere. Conversely any arrangement of great circles may be formed from the Gauss map of a zonohedron generated by vectors perpendicular to the planes through the circles.

Any simple zonohedron corresponds in this way to a simplicial arrangement, one in which each face is a triangle. Simplicial arrangements of great circles correspond via central projection to simplicial arrangements of lines in the projective plane. There are three known infinite families of simplicial arrangements, one of which leads to the prisms when converted to zonohedra, and the other two of which correspond to additional infinite families of simple zonohedra. There are also many sporadic examples that do not fit into these three families.

It follows from the correspondence between zonohedra and arrangements, and from the Sylvester–Gallai theorem which (in its projective dual form) proves the existence of crossings of only two lines in any arrangement, that every zonohedron has at least one pair of opposite parallelogram faces. (Squares, rectangles, and rhombuses count for this purpose as special cases of parallelograms.) More strongly, every zonohedron has at least six parallelogram faces, and every zonohedron has a number of parallelogram faces that is linear in its number of generators.

== Types ==
Any prism over a regular polygon with an even number of sides forms a zonohedron. These prisms can be formed so that all faces are regular: two opposite faces are equal to the regular polygon from which the prism was formed, and these are connected by a sequence of square faces. Zonohedra of this type are the cube, hexagonal prism, octagonal prism, decagonal prism, dodecagonal prism, etc.

In addition to this infinite family of regular-faced zonohedra, there are three Archimedean solids, all omnitruncations of the regular forms:

- The truncated octahedron, with 6 square and 8 hexagonal faces. (Omnitruncated tetrahedron)
- The truncated cuboctahedron, with 12 squares, 8 hexagons, and 6 octagons. (Omnitruncated cube)
- The truncated icosidodecahedron, with 30 squares, 20 hexagons and 12 decagons. (Omnitruncated dodecahedron)

In addition, certain Catalan solids (duals of Archimedean solids) are again zonohedra:

- Kepler's rhombic dodecahedron is the dual of the cuboctahedron.
- The rhombic triacontahedron is the dual of the icosidodecahedron.

Others with congruent rhombic faces:

- Bilinski's rhombic dodecahedron.
- Rhombic icosahedron
- Rhombohedron

There are infinitely many zonohedra with rhombic faces that are not all congruent to each other. They include:

- Rhombic enneacontahedron

zonohedron	image	number of generators	regular face	face transitive	edge transitive	vertex transitive	Parallelohedron (space-filling)	simple
Cube 4.4.4	Cube	3	Yes	Yes	Yes	Yes	Yes	Yes
Hexagonal prism 4.4.6	Hexagonal prism	4	Yes	No	No	Yes	Yes	Yes
2n-prism (n > 3) 4.4.2n	2n prism	n + 1	Yes	No	No	Yes	No	Yes
Truncated octahedron 4.6.6	Truncated octahedron	6	Yes	No	No	Yes	Yes	Yes
Truncated cuboctahedron 4.6.8	Truncated cuboctahedron	9	Yes	No	No	Yes	No	Yes
Truncated icosidodecahedron 4.6.10	Truncated icosidodecahedron	15	Yes	No	No	Yes	No	Yes
Parallelepiped	Parallelepiped	3	No	Yes	No	No	Yes	Yes
Rhombic dodecahedron V3.4.3.4	Kepler's rhombic dodecahedron	4	No	Yes	Yes	No	Yes	No
Bilinski dodecahedron	Bilinski's rhombic dodecahedron	4	No	No	No	No	Yes	No
Rhombic icosahedron	Rhombic icosahedron	5	No	No	No	No	No	No
Rhombic triacontahedron V3.5.3.5	Rhombic triacontehedron	6	No	Yes	Yes	No	No	No
Rhombo-hexagonal dodecahedron	rhombo-hexagonal dodecahedron	5	No	No	No	No	Yes	No
Truncated rhombic dodecahedron	Truncated Rhombic dodecahedron	7	No	No	No	No	No	Yes

== Dissections ==
Every zonohedron with $n$ zones can be partitioned into $\tbinom{n}{3}$ parallelepipeds, each having three of the same zones, and with one parallelepiped for each triple of zones.

The Dehn invariant of any zonohedron is zero. This implies that any two zonohedra with the same volume can be dissected into each other. This means that it is possible to cut one of the two zonohedra into polyhedral pieces that can be reassembled into the other.

== Zonohedrification ==
Zonohedrification is a process defined by George W. Hart for creating a zonohedron from another polyhedron.

First the vertices of any seed polyhedron are considered vectors from the polyhedron center. These vectors create the zonohedron which we call the zonohedrification of the original polyhedron. If the seed polyhedron has central symmetry, opposite points define the same direction, so the number of zones in the zonohedron is half the number of vertices of the seed. For any two vertices of the original polyhedron, there are two opposite planes of the zonohedrification which each have two edges parallel to the vertex vectors.

Examples
Symmetry	Dihedral	Octahedral				icosahedral			
Seed	8 vertex V4.4.6	6 vertex {3,4}	8 vertex {4,3}	12 vertex 3.4.3.4	14 vertex V3.4.3.4	12 vertex {3,5}	20 vertex {5,3}	30 vertex 3.5.3.5	32 vertex V3.5.3.5
Zonohedron	4 zone 4.4.6	3 zone {4,3}	4 zone Rhomb.12	6 zone 4.6.6	7 zone Ch.cube	6 zone Rhomb.30	10 zone Rhomb.90	15 zone 4.6.10	16 zone Rhomb.90

== Zonotopes ==
The Minkowski sum of line segments in any dimension forms a type of polytope called a zonotope. Equivalently, a zonotope $Z$ generated by vectors $v_1,...,v_k\in\mathbb{R}^n$ is given by $Z = \{a_1 v_1 + \cdots + a_k v_k | \; \forall(j) a_j\in [0,1]\}$. Note that in the special case where $k \leq n$, the zonotope $Z$ is a (possibly degenerate) parallelotope.

== Volume ==
Zonohedra, and n-dimensional zonotopes in general, are noteworthy for admitting a simple analytic formula for their volume.

Let $Z(S)$ be the zonotope $Z = \{a_1 v_1 + \cdots + a_k v_k | \; \forall(j) a_j\in [0,1]\}$ generated by a set of vectors $S = \{v_1,\dots,v_k\in\mathbb{R}^n\}$. Then the n-dimensional volume of $Z(S)$ is given by

$$\sum_{T\subset S \; : \; |T| = n} |\det(Z(T))|$$

The determinant in this formula makes sense because (as noted above) when the set $T$ has cardinality equal to the dimension $n$ of the ambient space, the zonotope is a parallelotope.

Note that when $k<n$, this formula simply states that the zonotope has n-volume zero.

== See also ==
- Equiprojective polyhedra
- Zonoid, the limit shape of a sequence of zonotopes
