= Zone axis =

High symmetry orientation of a crystal

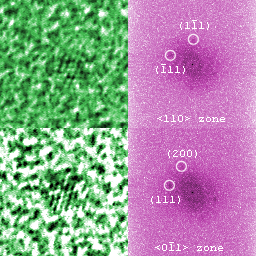
Nanocrystal (left) zone-axis patterns (right)

Zone axis, a term sometimes used to refer to "high-symmetry" orientations in a crystal, most generally refers to any direction referenced to the direct lattice (as distinct from the reciprocal lattice) of a crystal in three dimensions. It is therefore indexed with direct lattice indices, instead of with Miller indices.

High-symmetry zone axes through a crystal lattice, in particular, often lie in the direction of tunnels through the crystal between planes of atoms. This is because, as we see below, such zone axis directions generally lie within more than one plane of atoms in the crystal.

== Zone-axis indexing ==
The translational invariance of a crystal lattice is described by a set of unit cell, direct lattice basis vectors (contravariant or polar) called a, b, and c, or equivalently by the lattice parameters, i.e. the magnitudes of the vectors, called a, b and c, and the angles between them, called α (between b and c), β (between c and a), and γ (between a and b). Direct lattice vectors have components measured in distance units, like meters (m) or angstroms (Å).

A lattice vector is indexed by its coordinates in the direct lattice basis system $\{{\bf a}, {\bf b}, {\bf c}\}$ and is generally placed between square brackets []. Thus a direct lattice vector ${\bf s}_{uvw}$, or $[uvw]$, is defined as $u{\bf a}+v{\bf b}+w{\bf c}$. Angle brackets ⟨⟩ are used to refer to a symmetrically equivalent class of lattice vectors (i.e. the set of vectors generated by an action of the lattice's symmetry group). In the case of a cubic lattice, for instance, ⟨100⟩ represents [100], [010], [001], [1̅00], [01̅0] and [001̅] because each of these vectors is symmetrically equivalent under a 90 degree rotation along an axis. A bar over a coordinate is equivalent to a negative sign (e.g., $[\overline{1}00] = -{\bf a}$).

The term "zone axis" more specifically refers to the direction of a direct-space lattice vector. For example, since the [120] and [240] lattice vectors are parallel, their orientations both correspond the ⟨120⟩ zone of the crystal. Just as a set of lattice planes in direct space corresponds to a reciprocal lattice vector in the complementary space of spatial frequencies and momenta, a "zone" is defined as a set of reciprocal lattice planes in frequency space that corresponds to a lattice vector in direct space.

The reciprocal space analog to a zone axis is a "lattice plane normal" or "g-vector direction". Reciprocal lattice vectors (one-form or axial) are Miller-indexed using coordinates in the reciprocal lattice basis $\{{\bf a}^*, {\bf b}^*, {\bf c}^*\}$ instead, generally between round brackets () (similar to square brackets [] for direct lattice vectors). Curly brackets {} (not to be confused with a mathematical set) are used to refer to a symmetrically equivalent class of reciprocal lattice vectors, similar to angle brackets ⟨⟩ for classes of direct lattice vectors.

Here, ${\bf a}^* \equiv (b\times c)/V_c$, ${\bf b}^* \equiv (c\times a)/V_c$, and ${\bf c}^* \equiv (a\times b)/V_c$, where the unit cell volume is $V_c = {\bf a}\cdot({\bf b}\times {\bf c})$ ($\cdot$ denotes a dot product and $\times$ a cross product). Thus a reciprocal lattice vector ${\bf g}_{hkl}$ or $(hkl) = h{\bf a}^*+k{\bf b}^*+l{\bf c}^*$ has a direction perpendicular to a crystallographic plane and a magnitude $g_{hkl} = 1/d_{hkl}$ equal to the reciprocal of the spacing $d_{hkl}$ between those $(hkl)$ planes, measured in spatial frequency units, e.g. of cycles per angstrom (cycles/Å).

Bracket conventions for direct lattice and reciprocal lattice Miller indices in crystallography
| Object | Equivalence class | Specific vector | Units | Transformation |
|---|---|---|---|---|
| zone or lattice-vector s_{uvw} | $\langle{uvw\rangle}$ | $[uvw]$ | direct space, e.g. [meters] | contravariant or polar |
| plane or g-vector g_{hkl} | $\{hkl\}$ | $(hkl)$ | reciprocal space, e.g. [cycles/m] | covariant or axial |

A useful and quite general rule of crystallographic "dual vector spaces in 3D", e.g. reciprocal lattices, is that the condition for a direct lattice vector [uvw] (or zone axis) to be perpendicular to a reciprocal lattice vector (hkl) can be written with a dot product as $[uvw]\cdot (hkl)=uh+vk+wl=0$. This is true even if, as is often the case, the basis vector set used to describe the lattice is not Cartesian.

== Zone-axis patterns ==
By extension, a [uvw] zone-axis pattern (ZAP) is a diffraction pattern taken with an incident beam, e.g. of electrons, X-rays or neutrons traveling along a lattice direction specified by the zone-axis indices [uvw]. Because of their small wavelength λ, high energy electrons used in electron microscopes have a very large Ewald sphere radius (1/λ), so that electron diffraction generally "lights up" diffraction spots with g-vectors (hkl) that are perpendicular to [uvw].

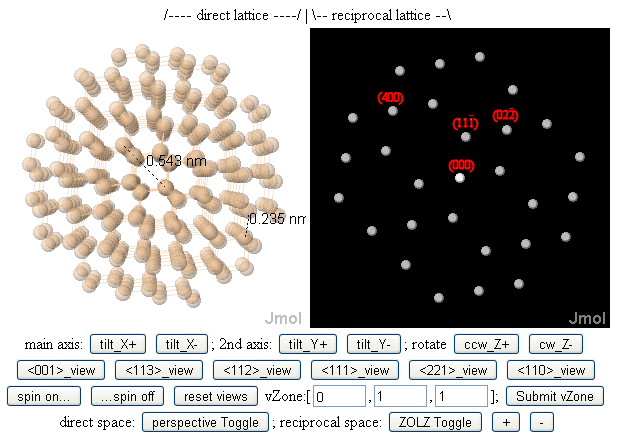
Diamond face centered cubic silicon atom cluster viewed down the [011] zone (left), with the corresponding zone-axis pattern (right).

One result of this, as illustrated in the figure above, is that "low-index" zones are generally perpendicular to "low-Miller index" lattice planes, which in turn have small spatial frequencies (g-values) and hence large lattice periodicities (d-spacings). A possible intuition behind this is that in electron microscopy, for electron beams to be directed down wide (i.e. easily visible) tunnels between columns of atoms in a crystal, directing the beam down a low-index (and by association high-symmetry) zone axis may help.

== See also ==
- Crystallography
- Dual basis
- Reciprocal lattice
- Miller index
- Diffraction
- Electron diffraction
- Transmission electron microscopy
