= Ruthenium-iridium nanosized coral =

Ruthenium-iridium nanosized corals (RuIr-NC) are electrodes consisting of nanosized anisotropic ruthenium-iridium sheets for efficient electrolysis of water in acid discovered in the Kyoto University.

The RuIr-NC were discovered unintentionally at the Kyoto University, but then investigated and refined for the purpose of efficient electrolysis of water in acid and found to have very promising qualities in terms of performance and durability.

As of 2021 the researchers at Kyoto University report their RuIr-NC are composed of 94% ruthenium and 6% iridium with the exposed hexagonal atomic arrangement corresponding to a hexagonal closed-packed (HCP) crystalline lattice plane crystal structure. The nanosheets take the form of 3 nm thick sheets with a mean diameter of 57 ± 7 nm. The researchers found them suitable for use as both oxygen evolution reaction (OER) and hydrogen evolution reaction (HER) electrodes.

Their water splitting cell using RuIr-NC as both OER and HER electrodes is able to achieve 10 mA cm^{−2}_{geo} at 1.485 V for 120 h without noticeable degradation. They report that, of the electrodes they evaluated for water electrolysis in acid, the RuIr-NC shows the highest intrinsic activity and stability.

The RuIr-NC is obtained by adding a mixture of RuCl_{3}·nH_{2}O and H_{2}IrCl_{6} aqueous solutions to triethylene glycol solution containing polyvinylpyrrolidone at 230 °C.

The research team at Kyoto University published their work in February 2021 and presented it at the Chemical Society of Japan 101. General Meeting in March 2021.
