= Dual basis =

Linear algebra concept

In linear algebra, given a vector space $V$ with a basis $B$ of vectors indexed by an index set $I$ (the cardinality of $I$ is the dimension of $V$), the dual set of $B$ is a set $B^*$ of vectors in the dual space $V^*$ with the same index set $I$ such that $B$ and $B^*$ form a biorthogonal system. The dual set is always linearly independent but does not necessarily span $V^*$. If it does span $V^*$, then $B^*$ is called the dual basis or reciprocal basis for the basis $B$.

Denoting the indexed vector sets as $B = \{v_i\}_{i\in I}$ and $B^{*} = \{v^i\}_{i \in I}$, being biorthogonal means that the elements pair to have an inner product equal to 1 if the indexes are equal, and equal to 0 otherwise. Symbolically, evaluating a dual vector in $V^*$ on a vector in the original space $V$:

$$v^i\cdot v_j = \delta^i_j =
\begin{cases}
1 & \text{if } i = j\\
0 & \text{if } i \ne j\text{,}
\end{cases}$$

where $\delta^i_j$ is the Kronecker delta symbol.

== Introduction ==
To perform operations with a vector, we must have a straightforward method of calculating its components. In a Cartesian frame the necessary operation is the dot product of the vector and the base vector. For example,

$$\mathbf{x} = x^1 \mathbf{i}_1 + x^2 \mathbf{i}_2 + x^3 \mathbf{i}_3$$

where $\{\mathbf{i}_1, \mathbf{i}_2, \mathbf{i}_3\}$ is the basis in a Cartesian frame. The components of $\mathbf{x}$ can be found by

$$x^k = \mathbf{x} \cdot \mathbf{i}_k.$$

However, in a non-Cartesian frame, we do not necessarily have $\mathbf{e}_i\cdot\mathbf{e}_j=0$ for all $i\neq j$. However, it is always possible to find vectors $\mathbf{e}^i$ in the dual space such that

$$x^i = \mathbf{e}^i(\mathbf{x}) \qquad  (i = 1, 2, 3).$$

The equality holds when the $\mathbf{e}^i$s are the dual basis of $\mathbf{e}_i$s. Notice the difference in position of the index $i$.

== Existence and uniqueness ==
The dual set always exists and gives an injection from V into V^{∗}, namely the mapping that sends v_{i} to v^{i}. This says, in particular, that the dual space has dimension greater or equal to that of V.

However, the dual set of an infinite-dimensional V does not span its dual space V^{∗}. For example, consider the map w in V^{∗} from V into the underlying scalars F given by w(v_{i}) = 1 for all i. This map is clearly nonzero on all v_{i}. If w were a finite linear combination of the dual basis vectors v^{i}, say $w=\sum_{i\in K}\alpha_iv^i$ for a finite subset K of I, then for any j not in K, $w(v_j)=\left(\sum_{i\in K}\alpha_iv^i\right)\left(v_j\right)=0$, contradicting the definition of w. So, this w does not lie in the span of the dual set.

The dual of an infinite-dimensional space has greater dimension (this being a greater infinite cardinality) than the original space has, and thus these cannot have a basis with the same indexing set. However, a dual set of vectors exists, which defines a subspace of the dual isomorphic to the original space. Further, for topological vector spaces, a continuous dual space can be defined, in which case a dual basis may exist.

=== Finite-dimensional vector spaces ===
In the case of finite-dimensional vector spaces, the dual set is always a dual basis and it is unique. These bases are denoted by $B=\{e_1,\dots,e_n\}$ and $B^*=\{e^1,\dots,e^n\}$. If one denotes the evaluation of a covector on a vector as a pairing, the biorthogonality condition becomes:

$$\left\langle e^i, e_j \right\rangle = \delta^i_j.$$

The association of a dual basis with a basis gives a map from the space of bases of V to the space of bases of V^{∗}, and this is also an isomorphism. For topological fields such as the real numbers, the space of duals is a topological space, and this gives a homeomorphism between the Stiefel manifolds of bases of these spaces.

== A categorical and algebraic construction of the dual space ==
Another way to introduce the dual space of a vector space (module) is by introducing it in a categorical sense. To do this, let $A$ be a module defined over the ring $R$ (that is, $A$ is an object in the category $R\text{-}\mathbf{Mod}$). Then we define the dual space of $A$, denoted $A^{\ast}$, to be $\text{Hom}_R(A,R)$, the module formed of all $R$-linear module homomorphisms from $A$ into $R$. Note then that we may define a dual to the dual, referred to as the double dual of $A$, written as $A^{\ast\ast}$, and defined as $\text{Hom}_R(A^{\ast},R)$.

To formally construct a basis for the dual space, we shall now restrict our view to the case where $F$ is a finite-dimensional free (left) $R$-module, where $R$ is a ring with unity. Then, we assume that the set $X$ is a basis for $F$. From here, we define the Kronecker Delta function $\delta_{xy}$ over the basis $X$ by $\delta_{xy}=1$ if $x=y$ and $\delta_{xy}=0$ if $x\ne y$. Then the set $S = \lbrace f_x:F \to R \; | \; f_x(y)=\delta_{xy} \rbrace$ describes a linearly independent set with each $f_x \in \text{Hom}_R(F,R)$. Since $F$ is finite-dimensional, the basis $X$ is of finite cardinality. Then, the set $S$ is a basis to $F^\ast$ and $F^\ast$ is a free (right) $R$-module.

== Examples ==
For example, the standard basis vectors of $\R^2$ (the Cartesian plane) are

$$\left\{\mathbf{e}_1, \mathbf{e}_2\right\} = \left\{
\begin{pmatrix}
1 \\
0
\end{pmatrix},
\begin{pmatrix}
0 \\
1
\end{pmatrix}
\right\}$$

and the standard basis vectors of its dual space $(\R^2)^*$ are

$$\left\{\mathbf{e}^1, \mathbf{e}^2\right \} = \left\{
\begin{pmatrix}
1 & 0
\end{pmatrix},
\begin{pmatrix}
0 & 1
\end{pmatrix}
\right\}\text{.}$$

In 3-dimensional Euclidean space, for a given basis $\{\mathbf{e}_1, \mathbf{e}_2, \mathbf{e}_3\}$, the biorthogonal (dual) basis $\{\mathbf{e}^1, \mathbf{e}^2, \mathbf{e}^3\}$ can be found by formulas below:

$$\mathbf{e}^1 = \left(\frac{\mathbf{e}_2 \times \mathbf{e}_3}{V}\right)^\mathsf{T},\
\mathbf{e}^2 = \left(\frac{\mathbf{e}_3 \times \mathbf{e}_1}{V}\right)^\mathsf{T},\
\mathbf{e}^3 = \left(\frac{\mathbf{e}_1 \times \mathbf{e}_2}{V}\right)^\mathsf{T}.$$

where ^{T} denotes the transpose and

$$V                                                   \,=\,
\left(\mathbf{e}_1;\mathbf{e}_2;\mathbf{e}_3\right) \,=\,
\mathbf{e}_1\cdot(\mathbf{e}_2\times\mathbf{e}_3)   \,=\,
\mathbf{e}_2\cdot(\mathbf{e}_3\times\mathbf{e}_1)   \,=\,
\mathbf{e}_3\cdot(\mathbf{e}_1\times\mathbf{e}_2)$$

is the volume of the parallelepiped formed by the basis vectors $\mathbf{e}_1,\,\mathbf{e}_2$ and $\mathbf{e}_3.$

In general the dual basis of a basis in a finite-dimensional vector space can be readily computed as follows: given the basis $f_1,\ldots,f_n$ and corresponding dual basis $f^1,\ldots,f^n$ we can build matrices

$$\begin{align}
F &= \begin{bmatrix}f_1 & \cdots & f_n \end{bmatrix} \\
G &= \begin{bmatrix}f^1 & \cdots & f^n \end{bmatrix}
\end{align}$$

Then the defining property of the dual basis states that

$$G^\mathsf{T}F = I$$

Hence the matrix for the dual basis $G$ can be computed as

$$G = \left(F^{-1}\right)^\mathsf{T}$$

== See also ==
- Reciprocal lattice
- Miller index
- Zone axis
