= Frequency-doubling illusion =

Apparent doubling of spatial frequency

The frequency-doubling illusion is an apparent doubling of spatial frequency when a sinusoidal grating is modulated rapidly in temporal counterphase. Recently, it has been proposed that the illusion arises from a spatially nonlinear ganglion cell class. The contrast threshold values needed for perceiving this physiological effect are used in frequency doubling technology perimetry for the detection of even early phases of glaucoma. A more recent study's results argue against the hypothesis that spatially nonlinear retinal ganglion cells are the physiological substrate of the frequency-doubling illusion. A cortical pathway of temporal phase discrimination may be the principal cause of the illusion, whereas spatial phase information (i.e., grating position) is retained.

Sensitivity to the spatial-frequency-doubling illusion was also positively correlated with reading lag and coherent motion. The results provide good support for a magno deficit in dyslexia that has its origins at a retinal level with impairment in—at least partially—M(y)-cell activity.
