= Pearson symbol =

Means of describing a crystal structure

The Pearson symbol, or Pearson notation, is used in crystallography as a means of describing a crystal structure. It was originated by William Burton Pearson and is used extensively in Pearson's handbook of crystallographic data for intermetallic phases. The symbol is made up of two letters followed by a number. For example:

- Diamond structure, cF8
- Rutile structure, tP6

== Construction ==
The two letters in the Pearson symbol specify the Bravais lattice, and more specifically, the lower-case letter specifies the crystal family, while the upper-case letter the lattice type. The number at the end of the Pearson symbol gives the number of the atoms in the conventional unit cell (atoms which satisfy $1 > x,y,z \geq 0$ for the atom's position $(x,y,z)$ in the unit cell). The following two tables give the six letters possible for the crystal family and the five letters possible for the lattice type:

Crystal family
a	triclinic = anorthic
m	monoclinic
o	orthorhombic
t	tetragonal
h	hexagonal
c	cubic

Lattice type + number of translation equivalent points
P	Primitive	1
S, A, B, C	One side/face centred	2
I	Body-centred (from German: innenzentriert)	2
R	Rhombohedral centring (see below)	3
F	All faces centred	4

The letters A, B and C were formerly used instead of S. When the centred face cuts the X axis, the Bravais lattice is called A-centred. In analogy, when the centred face cuts the Y or Z axis, we have B- or C-centring respectively.

The fourteen possible Bravais lattices are identified by the first two letters:

Crystal family	Lattice symbol	Pearson- symbol letters
Triclinic	P	aP
Monoclinic	P	mP
	S	mS
Orthorhombic	P	oP
	S	oS
	F	oF
	I	oI
Tetragonal	P	tP
	I	tI
Hexagonal	P	hP
	R	hR
Cubic	P	cP
	F	cF
	I	cI

== Pearson symbol and space group ==
The Pearson symbol does not uniquely identify the space group of a crystal structure. For example, both the NaCl structure (space group Fm3̅m) and diamond (space group Fd3̅m) have the same Pearson symbol cF8. Due to this constraint, the Pearson symbol should only be used to designate simple structures (elements, some binary compound) where the number of atoms per unit cell equals, ideally, the number of translationally equivalent points.

Confusion also arises in the rhombohedral lattice, which is alternatively described in a centred hexagonal (a = b, c, α = β = 90°, γ = 120°) or primitive rhombohedral (a = b = c, α = β = γ) setting. The more commonly used hexagonal setting has 3 translationally equivalent points per unit cell. The Pearson symbol refers to the hexagonal setting in its letter code (hR), but the following figure gives the number of translationally equivalent points in the primitive rhombohedral setting. Examples: hR1 and hR2 are used to designate the Hg and Bi structures respectively.

Because there are many possible structures that can correspond to one Pearson symbol, a prototypical compound may be useful to specify. Examples of how to write this would be hP12-MgZn$_2$ or cF8-C. Prototypical compounds for particular structures can be found on the Inorganic Crystal Structure Database (ICSD) or on the AFLOW Library of Crystallographic Prototypes.

== See also ==
- Crystal structure
- Bravais lattice
- Strukturbericht designation
