= Supercell (disambiguation) =

A supercell is a thunderstorm with a deep, persistently rotating updraft.

Supercell may also refer to:

- Supercell (crystal), a repeating unit cell of a crystal that contains several primitive cells
- Supercell (mobile network), a mobile phone network in North Kivu, Democratic Republic of Congo
- Supercell (company), a Finnish video game developer
- Supercell (band), a Japanese 11-member music group
  - Supercell (album), the band's debut album
- Supercell (film), a 2023 American disaster film
- Supacell, a 2024 British television series
- "Supercell", a song by King Gizzard & the Lizard Wizard from PetroDragonic Apocalypse
