= Crystal structure =

Ordered arrangement of atoms, ions, or molecules in a crystalline material

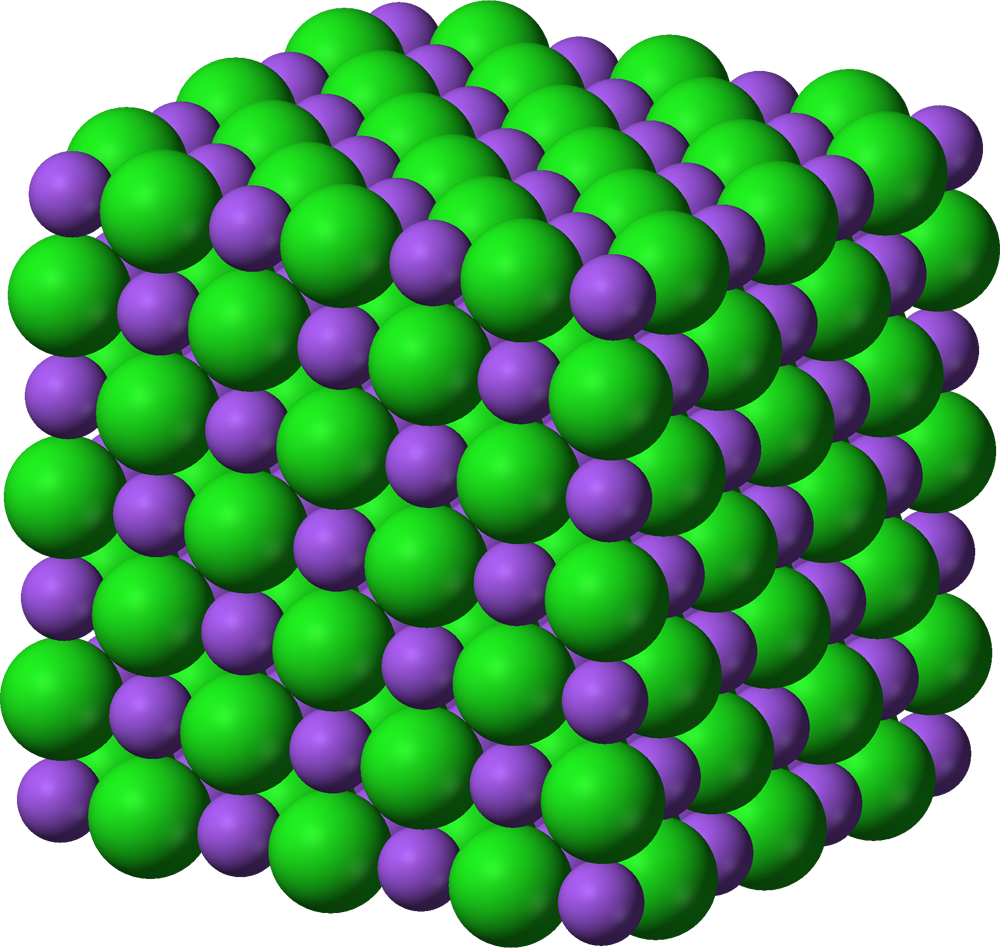
Crystal structure of table salt (sodium in purple, chlorine in green)

In crystallography, crystal structure is a description of the ordered arrangement of atoms, ions, or molecules in a crystalline material. Ordered structures occur from the intrinsic nature of constituent particles to form symmetric patterns that repeat along the principal directions of three-dimensional space in matter.

The smallest group of particles in a material that constitutes this repeating pattern is the unit cell of the structure. The unit cell completely reflects the symmetry and structure of the entire crystal, which is built up by repetitive translation of the unit cell along its principal axes. The translation vectors define the nodes of the Bravais lattice.

The lengths of principal axes/edges, of the unit cell and angles between them are lattice constants, also called lattice parameters or cell parameters. The symmetry properties of a crystal are described by the concept of space groups. All possible symmetric arrangements of particles in three-dimensional space may be described by 230 space groups.

The crystal structure and symmetry play a critical role in determining many physical properties, such as cleavage, electronic band structure, and optical transparency.

== Unit cell ==
Crystal structure is described in terms of the geometry of the arrangement of particles in the unit cells. The unit cell is defined as the smallest repeating unit having the full symmetry of the crystal structure. The geometry of the unit cell is defined as a parallelepiped, providing six lattice parameters taken as the lengths of the cell edges (a, b, c) and the angles between them (α, β, γ). The positions of particles inside the unit cell are described by the fractional coordinates (x_{i}, y_{i}, z_{i}) along the cell edges, measured from a reference point. It is thus only necessary to report the coordinates of a smallest asymmetric subset of particles, called the crystallographic asymmetric unit. The asymmetric unit may be chosen so that it occupies the smallest physical space, which means that not all particles need to be physically located inside the boundaries given by the lattice parameters. All other particles of the unit cell are generated by the symmetry operations that characterize the symmetry of the unit cell. The collection of symmetry operations of the unit cell is expressed formally as the space group of the crystal structure.

Simple cubic (P)

Body-centered cubic (I)

Face-centered cubic (F)

=== Miller indices ===
Planes with different Miller indices in cubic crystals

Vectors and planes in a crystal lattice are described by the three-value Miller index notation. This syntax uses the indices h, k, and ℓ as directional parameters.

By definition, the syntax (hkℓ) denotes a plane that intercepts the three points a_{1}/h, a_{2}/k, and a_{3}/ℓ, or some multiple thereof. That is, the Miller indices are proportional to the inverses of the intercepts of the plane with the unit cell (in the basis of the lattice vectors). If one or more of the indices is zero, the planes do not intersect that axis (i.e., the intercept is "at infinity"). A plane containing a coordinate axis is translated to no longer contain that axis before its Miller indices are determined. The Miller indices for a plane are integers with no common factors. Negative indices are indicated with horizontal bars, as in (12̅3). In an orthogonal coordinate system for a cubic cell, the Miller indices of a plane are the Cartesian components of a vector normal to the plane.

Considering only (hkℓ) planes intersecting one or more lattice points (the lattice planes), the distance d between adjacent lattice planes is related to the (shortest) reciprocal lattice vector orthogonal to the planes by the formula

$$d = \frac{2\pi}  {|\mathbf{g}_{h k \ell}|}$$

=== Planes and directions ===
The crystallographic directions are geometric lines linking nodes (atoms, ions or molecules) of a crystal. Likewise, the crystallographic planes are geometric planes linking nodes. Some directions and planes have a higher density of nodes. These high-density planes influence the behaviour of the crystal as follows:

- Optical properties: Refractive index is directly related to density (or periodic density fluctuations).
- Adsorption and reactivity: Physical adsorption and chemical reactions occur at or near surface atoms or molecules. These phenomena are thus sensitive to the density of nodes.
- Surface tension: The condensation of a material means that the atoms, ions or molecules are more stable if they are surrounded by other similar species. The surface tension of an interface thus varies according to the density on the surface.

Dense crystallographic planes

- Microstructural defects: Pores and crystallites tend to have straight grain boundaries following higher density planes.
- Cleavage: This typically occurs preferentially parallel to higher density planes.
- Plastic deformation: Dislocation glide occurs preferentially parallel to higher density planes. The perturbation carried by the dislocation (Burgers vector) is along a dense direction. The shift of one node in a more dense direction requires a lesser distortion of the crystal lattice.

Some directions and planes are defined by symmetry of the crystal system. In monoclinic, trigonal, tetragonal, and hexagonal systems there is one unique axis (sometimes called the principal axis) which has higher rotational symmetry than the other two axes. The basal plane is the plane perpendicular to the principal axis in these crystal systems. For triclinic, orthorhombic, and cubic crystal systems the axis designation is arbitrary and there is no principal axis.

==== Cubic structures ====
For the special case of simple cubic crystals, the lattice vectors are orthogonal and of equal length (usually denoted a); similarly for the reciprocal lattice. So, in this common case, the Miller indices (ℓmn) and [ℓmn] both simply denote normals/directions in Cartesian coordinates. For cubic crystals with lattice constant a, the spacing d between adjacent (ℓmn) lattice planes is (from above):

$$d_{\ell mn}= \frac {a} { \sqrt{\ell ^2 + m^2 + n^2} }$$

Because of the symmetry of cubic crystals, it is possible to change the place and sign of the integers and have equivalent directions and planes:

- Coordinates in angle brackets such as ⟨100⟩ denote a family of directions that are equivalent due to symmetry operations, such as [100], [010], [001] or the negative of any of those directions.
- Coordinates in curly brackets or braces such as {100} denote a family of plane normals that are equivalent due to symmetry operations, much the way angle brackets denote a family of directions.

For face-centered cubic (fcc) and body-centered cubic (bcc) lattices, the primitive lattice vectors are not orthogonal. However, in these cases the Miller indices are conventionally defined relative to the lattice vectors of the cubic supercell and hence are again simply the Cartesian directions.

=== Interplanar spacing ===
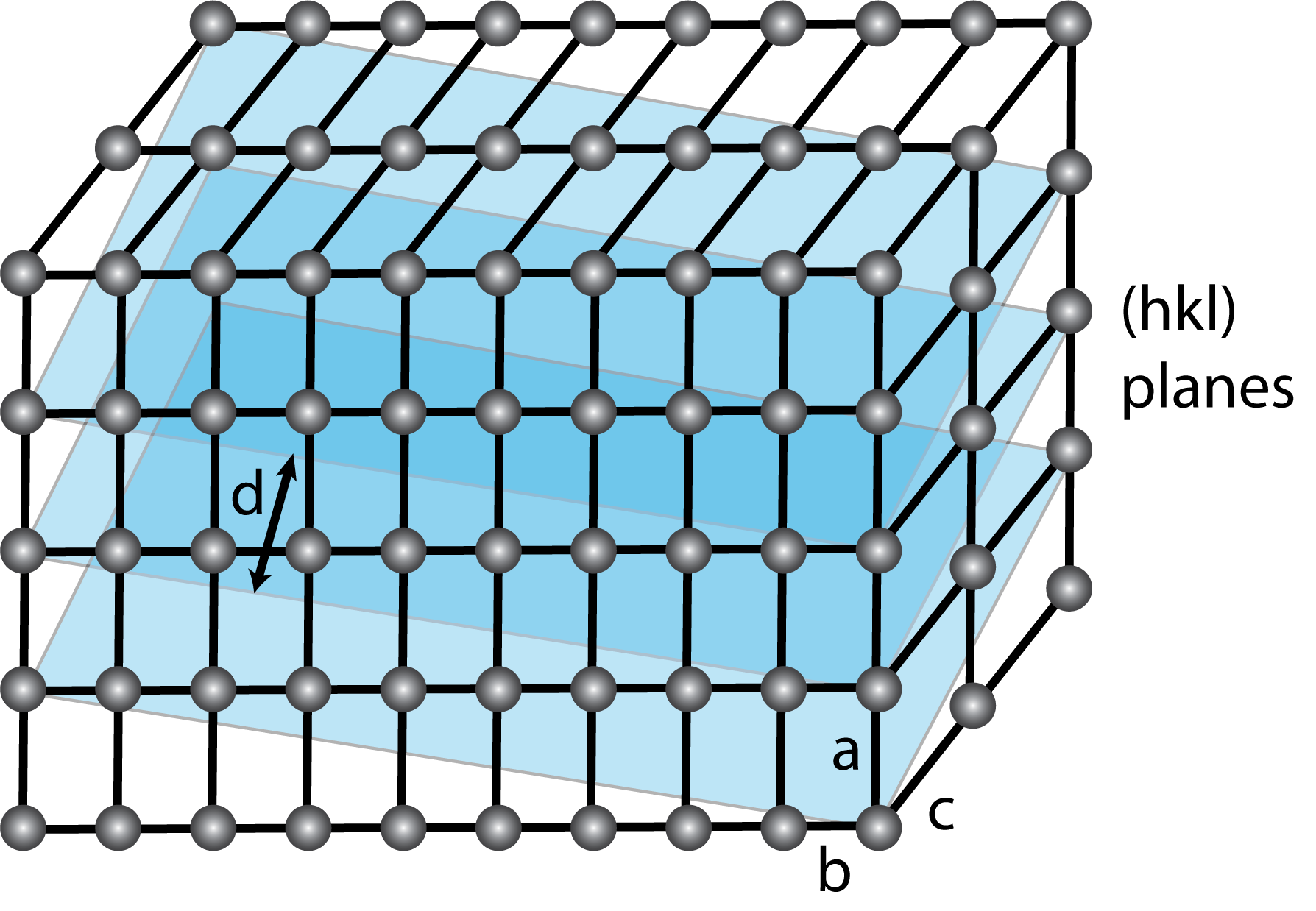
Diagram of a crystal with the interplanar spacing d for (hkl) planes, and a, b, c lattice constants labeled

The perpendicular spacing d between adjacent (hkℓ) lattice planes is given by:

- Cubic:
  $$\frac {1} {d^{2}}= \frac {h^2+k^2+\ell^2} {a^2}$$
- Tetragonal:
  $$\frac {1} {d^{2}}= \frac {h^2+k^2} {a^2}+\frac{\ell^2}{c^2}$$
- Hexagonal:
  $$\frac {1} {d^{2}}= \frac{4}{3}\left(\frac{h^2+hk+k^2}{a^2}\right)+\frac{\ell^2}{c^2}$$
- Rhombohedral (primitive setting):
  $$\frac {1} {d^{2}}= \frac{(h^2+k^2+\ell^2)\sin^2\alpha+2(hk+k\ell+h\ell)(\cos^2\alpha-\cos\alpha)}{a^2(1-3\cos^2\alpha+2\cos^3\alpha)}$$
- Orthorhombic:
  $$\frac {1} {d^{2}}= \frac{h^2}{a^2}+\frac{k^2}{b^2}+\frac{\ell^2}{c^2}$$
- Monoclinic:
  $$\frac {1} {d^{2}}=\left(\frac{h^2}{a^2}+\frac{k^2\sin^2\beta}{b^2}+\frac{\ell^2}{c^2}-\frac{2h\ell\cos\beta}{ac}\right) \csc^2\beta$$
- Triclinic:
  $$\frac {1} {d^{2}}= \frac{\frac{h^2}{a^2}\sin^2\alpha+\frac{k^2}{b^2}\sin^2\beta+\frac{\ell^2}{c^2}\sin^2\gamma+\frac{2k\ell}{bc}(\cos\beta\cos\gamma-\cos\alpha)+\frac{2h\ell}{ac}(\cos\gamma\cos\alpha-\cos\beta)+\frac{2hk}{ab}(\cos\alpha\cos\beta-\cos\gamma)}{1-\cos^2\alpha-\cos^2\beta-\cos^2\gamma+2\cos\alpha\cos\beta\cos\gamma}$$

== Classification by symmetry ==
The defining property of a crystal is its inherent symmetry. Performing certain symmetry operations on the crystal lattice leaves it unchanged. All crystals have translational symmetry in three directions, but some have other symmetry elements as well. For example, rotating the crystal 180° about a certain axis may result in an atomic configuration that is identical to the original configuration; the crystal has twofold rotational symmetry about this axis. In addition to rotational symmetry, a crystal may have symmetry in the form of mirror planes, and also the so-called compound symmetries, which are a combination of translation and rotation or mirror symmetries. A full classification of a crystal is achieved when all inherent symmetries of the crystal are identified.

=== Lattice systems ===
Lattice systems are a grouping of crystal structures according to the point groups of their lattice. All crystals fall into one of seven lattice systems. They are related to, but not the same as the seven crystal systems.

Crystal family	Lattice system	Point group (Hermann-Mauguin)	14 Bravais lattices (Pearson symbol)			
Crystal family	Lattice system	Point group (Hermann-Mauguin)	Primitive	Base-centered	Body-centered	Face-centered
Triclinic		$\bar{1}$	aP			
Monoclinic		$2/m$	mP	mS		
Orthorhombic		$mmm$	oP	oS	oI	oF
Tetragonal		$4/mmm$	tP		tI	
Hexagonal	Rhombohedral	$\bar{3} m$	hR			
Hexagonal	Hexagonal	$6/mmm$	hP			
Cubic		$m \bar{3} m$	cP		cI	cF

The most symmetric, the cubic or isometric system, has the symmetry of a cube, that is, it exhibits four threefold rotational axes oriented at 109.5° (the tetrahedral angle) with respect to each other. These threefold axes lie along the body diagonals of the cube. The other six lattice systems, are hexagonal, tetragonal, rhombohedral (often confused with the trigonal crystal system), orthorhombic, monoclinic and triclinic which is the least symmetrical as it possess only identity (E).

==== Bravais lattices ====
Bravais lattices, also referred to as space lattices, describe the geometric arrangement of the lattice points, and therefore the translational symmetry of the crystal. The three dimensions of space afford 14 distinct Bravais lattices describing the translational symmetry. All crystalline materials recognized today, not including quasicrystals, fit in one of these arrangements. The fourteen three-dimensional lattices, classified by lattice system, are shown above.

The crystal structure consists of the same group of atoms, the basis, positioned around each and every lattice point. This group of atoms therefore repeats indefinitely in three dimensions according to the arrangement of one of the Bravais lattices. The characteristic rotation and mirror symmetries of the unit cell is described by its crystallographic point group.

=== Crystal systems ===
A crystal system is a set of point groups in which the point groups themselves and their corresponding space groups are assigned to a lattice system. Of the 32 point groups that exist in three dimensions, most are assigned to only one lattice system, in which case the crystal system and lattice system both have the same name. However, five point groups are assigned to two lattice systems, rhombohedral and hexagonal, because both lattice systems exhibit threefold rotational symmetry. These point groups are assigned to the trigonal crystal system.

Crystal family	Crystal system	Required symmetries	32 crystal classes (Hermann-Mauguin)						
Crystal family	Crystal system	Required symmetries	Primitive	Inverse	Central	Axial	Planar	Inverse-planar	Planar-axial
Triclinic		None	1	1̅					
Monoclinic		1 twofold axis of rotation or 1 mirror plane	2	m	^{2}/_{m}				
Orthorhombic		3 twofold axes of rotation or 1 twofold axis of rotation and 2 mirror planes				222	mm2		mmm
Tetragonal		1 fourfold axis of rotation	4	4̅	^{4}/_{m}	422	4mm	4̅2m	4/mmm
Hexagonal	Trigonal	1 threefold axis of rotation	3	3̅		32	3m	3̅m	
Hexagonal	Hexagonal	1 sixfold axis of rotation	6	6̅	^{6}/_{m}	622	6mm	6̅m2	6/mmm
Cubic		4 threefold axes of rotation	23		m3̅	432		4̅3m	m3̅m

In total there are seven crystal systems: triclinic, monoclinic, orthorhombic, tetragonal, trigonal, hexagonal, and cubic.

==== Crystal classes ====
The crystallographic point group or crystal class is the mathematical group comprising the symmetry operations that leave at least one point unmoved and that leave the appearance of the crystal structure unchanged. These symmetry operations include

- Reflection, which reflects the structure across a reflection plane
- Rotation, which rotates the structure a specified portion of a circle about a rotation axis
- Inversion, which changes the sign of the coordinate of each point with respect to a center of symmetry or inversion point
- Improper rotation, which consists of a rotation about an axis followed by an inversion.

Rotation axes (proper and improper), reflection planes, and centers of symmetry are collectively called symmetry elements. There are 32 possible crystal classes. Each one can be classified into one of the seven crystal systems.

=== Space groups ===
In addition to the operations of the point group, the space group of the crystal structure contains translational symmetry operations. These include:

- Pure translations, which move a point along a vector
- Screw axes, which rotate a point around an axis while translating parallel to the axis.
- Glide planes, which reflect a point through a plane while translating it parallel to the plane.

There are 230 distinct space groups.

== Atomic coordination ==
By considering the arrangement of atoms relative to each other, their coordination numbers, interatomic distances, types of bonding, etc., it is possible to form a general view of the structures and alternative ways of visualizing them.

=== Close packing ===
The hcp lattice (left) and the fcc/ccp lattice (right)

The principles involved can be understood by considering the most efficient way of packing together equal-sized spheres and stacking close-packed atomic planes in three dimensions. For example, if plane A lies beneath plane B, there are two possible ways of placing an additional atom on top of layer B. If an additional layer were placed directly over plane A, this would give rise to the following series:

...ABABABAB...
This arrangement of atoms in a crystal structure is known as hexagonal close packing (hcp).

If, however, all three planes are staggered relative to each other and it is not until the fourth layer is positioned directly over plane A that the sequence is repeated, then the following sequence arises:

...ABCABCABC...
This type of structural arrangement is known as cubic close packing (ccp) or face-centered cubic (fcc).

The unit cell of a ccp arrangement of atoms is the face-centered cubic (fcc) unit cell. This is not immediately obvious, as the closely packed layers are parallel to the {111} planes of the fcc unit cell. There are four different orientations of the close-packed layers.

=== APF and CN ===
One important characteristic of a crystalline structure is its atomic packing factor (APF). This is calculated by assuming that all the atoms are identical spheres, with a radius large enough that each sphere abuts on the next. The atomic packing factor is the proportion of space filled by these spheres which can be worked out by calculating the total volume of the spheres and dividing by the volume of the cell as follows:

$$\mathrm{APF} = \frac{N_\mathrm{particle} V_\mathrm{particle}}{V_\text{unit cell}}$$

Another important characteristic of a crystalline structure is its coordination number (CN). This is the number of nearest neighbours of a central atom in the structure.

The APFs and CNs of the most common crystal structures are shown below:

Crystal structure	Atomic packing factor	Coordination number (Geometry)
Diamond cubic	0.34	4 (Tetrahedron)
Simple cubic	0.52	6 (Octahedron)
Body-centered cubic (BCC)	0.68	8 (Cube)
Face-centered cubic (FCC)	0.74	12 (Cuboctahedron)
Hexagonal close-packed (HCP)	0.74	12 (Triangular orthobicupola)

The 74% packing efficiency of the FCC and HCP is the maximum density possible in unit cells constructed of spheres of only one size.

=== Interstitial sites ===
Octahedral (red) and tetrahedral (blue) interstitial sites in a face-centered cubic lattice.

Interstitial sites refer to the empty spaces in between the atoms in the crystal lattice. These spaces can be filled by oppositely charged ions to form multi-element structures. They can also be filled by impurity atoms or self-interstitials to form interstitial defects.

== Defects and impurities ==
Real crystals feature defects or irregularities in the ideal arrangements described above and it is these defects that critically determine many of the electrical and mechanical properties of real materials.

=== Impurities ===
When one atom substitutes for one of the principal atomic components within the crystal structure, alteration in the electrical and thermal properties of the material may ensue. Impurities may also manifest as electron spin impurities in certain materials. Research on magnetic impurities demonstrates that substantial alteration of certain properties such as specific heat may be affected by small concentrations of an impurity, as for example impurities in semiconducting ferromagnetic alloys may lead to different properties as first predicted in the late 1960s.

=== Dislocations ===
Dislocations in a crystal lattice are line defects that are associated with local stress fields. Dislocations allow shear at lower stress than that needed for a perfect crystal structure. The local stress fields result in interactions between the dislocations which then result in strain hardening or cold working.

=== Grain boundaries ===
Grain boundaries are interfaces where crystals of different orientations meet. A grain boundary is a single-phase interface, with crystals on each side of the boundary being identical except in orientation. The term "crystallite boundary" is sometimes, though rarely, used. Grain boundary areas contain those atoms that have been perturbed from their original lattice sites, dislocations, and impurities that have migrated to the lower energy grain boundary.

Treating a grain boundary geometrically as an interface of a single crystal cut into two parts, one of which is rotated, we see that there are five variables required to define a grain boundary. The first two numbers come from the unit vector that specifies a rotation axis. The third number designates the angle of rotation of the grain. The final two numbers specify the plane of the grain boundary (or a unit vector that is normal to this plane).

Grain boundaries disrupt the motion of dislocations through a material, so reducing crystallite size is a common way to improve strength, as described by the Hall–Petch relationship. Since grain boundaries are defects in the crystal structure they tend to decrease the electrical and thermal conductivity of the material. The high interfacial energy and relatively weak bonding in most grain boundaries often makes them preferred sites for the onset of corrosion and for the precipitation of new phases from the solid. They are also important to many of the mechanisms of creep.

Grain boundaries are in general only a few nanometers wide. In common materials, crystallites are large enough that grain boundaries account for a small fraction of the material. However, very small grain sizes are achievable. In nanocrystalline solids, grain boundaries become a significant volume fraction of the material, with profound effects on such properties as diffusion and plasticity. In the limit of small crystallites, as the volume fraction of grain boundaries approaches 100%, the material ceases to have any crystalline character, and thus becomes an amorphous solid.

== Prediction of structure ==
The difficulty of predicting stable crystal structures based on the knowledge of only the chemical composition has long been a stumbling block on the way to fully computational materials design. Now, with more powerful algorithms and high-performance computing, structures of medium complexity can be predicted using such approaches as evolutionary algorithms, random sampling, or metadynamics.

The crystal structures of simple ionic solids (e.g., NaCl or table salt) have long been rationalized in terms of Pauling's rules, first set out in 1929 by Linus Pauling, referred to by many since as the "father of the chemical bond". Pauling also considered the nature of the interatomic forces in metals, and concluded that about half of the five d-orbitals in the transition metals are involved in bonding, with the remaining nonbonding d-orbitals being responsible for the magnetic properties. Pauling was therefore able to correlate the number of d-orbitals in bond formation with the bond length, as well as with many of the physical properties of the substance. He subsequently introduced the metallic orbital, an extra orbital necessary to permit uninhibited resonance of valence bonds among various electronic structures.

In the resonating valence bond theory, the factors that determine the choice of one from among alternative crystal structures of a metal or intermetallic compound revolve around the energy of resonance of bonds among interatomic positions. It is clear that some modes of resonance would make larger contributions (be more mechanically stable than others), and that in particular a simple ratio of number of bonds to number of positions would be exceptional. The resulting principle is that a special stability is associated with the simplest ratios or "bond numbers": 1/2, 1/3, 2/3, 1/4, 3/4, etc. The choice of structure and the value of the axial ratio (which determines the relative bond lengths) are thus a result of the effort of an atom to use its valency in the formation of stable bonds with simple fractional bond numbers.

After postulating a direct correlation between electron concentration and crystal structure in beta-phase alloys, Hume-Rothery analyzed the trends in melting points, compressibilities and bond lengths as a function of group number in the periodic table in order to establish a system of valencies of the transition elements in the metallic state. This treatment thus emphasized the increasing bond strength as a function of group number. The operation of directional forces were emphasized in one article on the relation between bond hybrids and the metallic structures. The resulting correlation between electronic and crystalline structures is summarized by a single parameter, the weight of the d-electrons per hybridized metallic orbital. The "d-weight" calculates out to 0.5, 0.7 and 0.9 for the fcc, hcp and bcc structures respectively. The relationship between d-electrons and crystal structure thus becomes apparent.

In crystal structure predictions/simulations, the periodicity is usually applied, since the system is imagined as being unlimited in all directions. Starting from a triclinic structure with no further symmetry property assumed, the system may be driven to show some additional symmetry properties by applying Newton's second law on particles in the unit cell and a recently developed dynamical equation for the system period vectors (lattice parameters including angles), even if the system is subject to external stress.

== Polymorphism ==
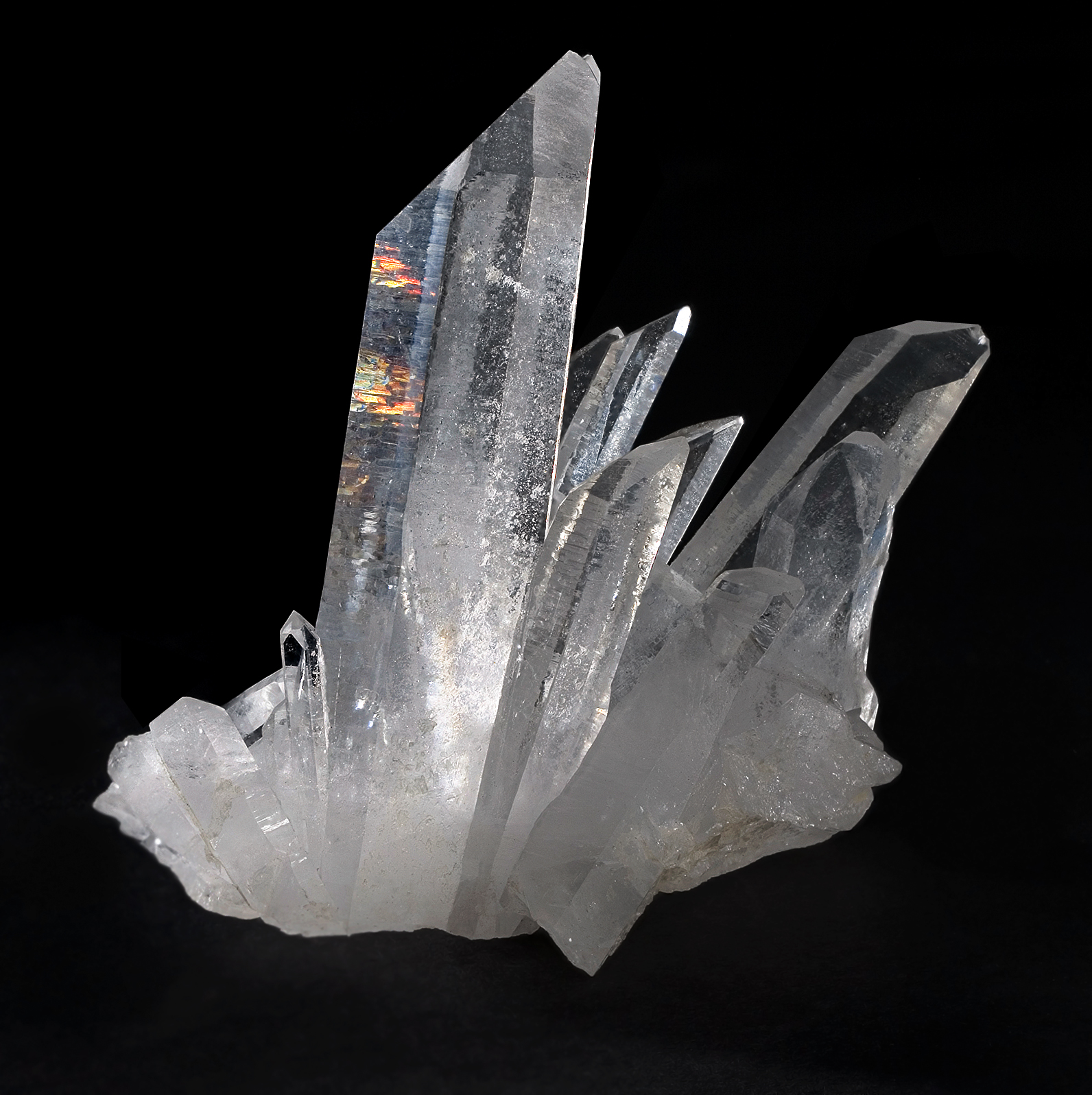
Quartz is one of the several crystalline forms of silica, SiO_{2}. The most important forms of silica include: α-quartz, β-quartz, tridymite, cristobalite, coesite, and stishovite.

Polymorphism is the occurrence of multiple crystalline forms of a material. It is found in many crystalline materials including polymers, minerals, and metals. According to Gibbs' rules of phase equilibria, these unique crystalline phases are dependent on intensive variables such as pressure and temperature. Polymorphism is related to allotropy, which refers to elemental solids. The complete morphology of a material is described by polymorphism and other variables such as crystal habit, amorphous fraction or crystallographic defects. Polymorphs have different stabilities and may spontaneously and irreversibly transform from a metastable form (or thermodynamically unstable form) to the stable form at a particular temperature. They also exhibit different melting points, solubilities, and X-ray diffraction patterns.

One good example of this is the quartz form of silicon dioxide, or SiO_{2}. In the vast majority of silicates, the Si atom shows tetrahedral coordination by 4 oxygens. All but one of the crystalline forms involve tetrahedral {SiO_{4}} units linked together by shared vertices in different arrangements. In different minerals the tetrahedra show different degrees of networking and polymerization. For example, they occur singly, joined in pairs, in larger finite clusters including rings, in chains, double chains, sheets, and three-dimensional frameworks. The minerals are classified into groups based on these structures. In each of the 7 thermodynamically stable crystalline forms or polymorphs of crystalline quartz, only 2 out of 4 of each the edges of the {SiO_{4}} tetrahedra are shared with others, yielding the net chemical formula for silica: SiO_{2}.

Another example is elemental tin (Sn), which is malleable near ambient temperatures but is brittle when cooled. This change in mechanical properties due to existence of its two major allotropes, α- and β-tin. The two allotropes that are encountered at normal pressure and temperature, α-tin and β-tin, are more commonly known as gray tin and white tin respectively. Two more allotropes, γ and σ, exist at temperatures above 161 °C and pressures above several GPa. White tin is metallic, and is the stable crystalline form at or above room temperature. Below 13.2 °C, tin exists in the gray form, which has a diamond cubic crystal structure, similar to diamond, silicon or germanium. Gray tin has no metallic properties at all, is a dull gray powdery material, and has few uses, other than a few specialized semiconductor applications. Although the α–β transformation temperature of tin is nominally 13.2 °C, impurities (e.g. Al, Zn, etc.) lower the transition temperature well below 0 °C, and upon addition of Sb or Bi the transformation may not occur at all.

== Physical properties ==
Twenty of the 32 crystal classes are piezoelectric, and crystals belonging to one of these classes (point groups) display piezoelectricity. All piezoelectric classes lack inversion symmetry. Any material develops a dielectric polarization when an electric field is applied, but a substance that has such a natural charge separation even in the absence of a field is called a polar material. Whether or not a material is polar is determined solely by its crystal structure. Only ten of the 32 point groups are polar. All polar crystals are pyroelectric, so the ten polar crystal classes are sometimes referred to as the pyroelectric classes.

There are a few crystal structures, notably the perovskite structure, which exhibit ferroelectric behavior. This is analogous to ferromagnetism, in that, in the absence of an electric field during production, the ferroelectric crystal does not exhibit a polarization. Upon the application of an electric field of sufficient magnitude, the crystal becomes permanently polarized. This polarization can be reversed by a sufficiently large counter-charge, in the same way that a ferromagnet can be reversed. However, although they are called ferroelectrics, the effect is due to the crystal structure (not the presence of a ferrous metal).

== See also ==
- Brillouin zone – a primitive cell in the reciprocal space lattice of a crystal
- Chemical crystallography before X-rays
- Crystal engineering
- Crystal growth – a major stage of a crystallization process
- Crystallographic database
- Fractional coordinates
- Frank–Kasper phases
- Geometrical crystallography before X-rays
- Hermann–Mauguin notation – a notation to represent symmetry in point groups, plane groups and space groups
- Laser-heated pedestal growth – a crystal growth technique
- Liquid crystal – a state of matter with properties of both conventional liquids and crystals
- Patterson function – a function used to solve the phase problem in X-ray crystallography
- Periodic table (crystal structure) – (for elements that are solid at standard temperature and pressure) gives the crystalline structure of the most thermodynamically stable form(s) in those conditions. In all other cases the structure given is for the element at its melting point.
- Primitive cell – a repeating unit formed by the vectors spanning the points of a lattice
- Protein crystallization
- Seed crystal – a small piece of a single crystal used to initiate growth of a larger crystal
- Wigner–Seitz cell – a primitive cell of a crystal lattice with Voronoi decomposition applied
