= Supercell (crystal) =

Some different supercells for 2D cubic crystal. Both diagonal and non-diagonal supercells presented.

In solid-state physics and crystallography, a crystal structure is described by a unit cell repeating periodically over space. There are an infinite number of choices for unit cells, with different shapes and sizes, which can describe the same crystal, and different choices can be useful for different purposes.

Say that a crystal structure is described by a unit cell U. Another unit cell S is a supercell of unit cell U, if S is a cell which describes the same crystal, but has a larger volume than cell U. Many methods which use a supercell perturbate it somehow to determine properties which cannot be determined by the initial cell. For example, during phonon calculations by the small displacement method, phonon frequencies in crystals are calculated using force values on slightly displaced atoms in the supercell. Another very important example of a supercell is the conventional cell of body-centered (bcc) or face-centered (fcc) cubic crystals.

== Unit cell transformation ==
The basis vectors of unit cell U $(\vec{a},\vec{b},\vec{c})$ can be transformed to basis vectors of supercell S $(\vec{a}',\vec{b}',\vec{c}')$ by linear transformation

$$\begin{pmatrix}
\vec{a}' & \vec{b}' & \vec{c}' \\
\end{pmatrix}
=
\begin{pmatrix}
\vec{a} & \vec{b} & \vec{c} \\
\end{pmatrix}
\hat{P}=
\begin{pmatrix}
\vec{a} & \vec{b} & \vec{c} \\
\end{pmatrix}
\begin{pmatrix}
P_{11} & P_{12} & P_{13} \\
P_{21} & P_{22} & P_{23} \\
P_{31} & P_{32} & P_{33} \\
\end{pmatrix}$$
where $\hat{P}$ is a transformation matrix. All elements $P_{ij}$ should be integers with $\det(\hat{P}) > 1$ (with $\det(\hat{P}) = 1$ the transformation preserves volume). For example, the matrix
$$P_{P\rightarrow I}=
\begin{pmatrix}
0 & 1 & 1 \\
1 & 0 & 1 \\
1 & 1 & 0 \\
\end{pmatrix}$$
transforms a primitive cell to body-centered. Another particular case of the transformation is a diagonal matrix (i.e., $P_{i \neq j}=0$). This called diagonal supercell expansion and can be represented as repeating of the initial cell over crystallographic axes of the initial cell.

== Application ==
Supercells are also commonly used in computational models of crystal defects to allow the use of periodic boundary conditions.

== See also ==
- Crystal structure
- Bravais lattice
- Primitive cell
- Space group
