= Lattice plane =

Crystallographic concept

The lattice planes created from the miller indices for (100), (010), (001), (110), (101), (011), (1̅10), (1̅01), (01̅1), (111), (1̅11), (11̅1), (111̅), (102), (1̅02).

In crystallography, a lattice plane of a given Bravais lattice is any plane containing at least three noncollinear Bravais lattice points. Equivalently, a lattice plane is a plane whose intersections with the lattice (or any crystalline structure of that lattice) are periodic (i.e. are described by 2D Bravais lattices). A family of lattice planes is a collection of equally spaced parallel lattice planes that, taken together, intersect all lattice points. Every family of lattice planes can be described by a set of integer Miller indices that have no common divisors (i.e. are relative prime). Conversely, every set of Miller indices without common divisors defines a family of lattice planes. In example figure 1 shows (100), (010), and (001) are a family of lattice planes and can be denoted by {100}. If, on the other hand, the Miller indices are not relative prime, the family of planes defined by them is not a family of lattice planes, because not every plane of the family then intersects lattice points.

Conversely, planes that are not lattice planes have aperiodic intersections with the lattice called quasicrystals; this is known as a "cut-and-project" construction of a quasicrystal (and is typically also generalized to higher dimensions).

The lattice planes for the miller indices (111), (100), (110), and (222) in CsCl cubic lattice. Where the pink atoms are Cs and the purple are Cl.

Miller indices is a notation system for lattice planes in crystallography. It is made from three integers h, k, and l. Written as (hkl). The values of these are given by the question g_{hkl} = hb_{1} + kb_{2} + lb_{3}. Where b is the basis of the reciprocal lattice for a given Bravais lattice. Each integer is related to the reciprocal lattice axis a, b, and c respectively. To find the plane indicated by the miller indices, first take the integers (hkl) and dived 1 by them to get 1/h,1/k,1/l . Next take the Bravais lattice with the axis a,b,c and choose an origin. From the origin move on the axis by respectively. For example, if the miller indices were (111) then you would get 1/1,1/1,1/1 which equals 1,1,1 which means to move up each axis by 1 to find the plane from the origin. Figure 2 shows the miler indices in a real crystal lattice: CsCl cubic crystal lattice (Pm3̅m space group).
