= MTEX =

Electron Backscatter Diffraction software

- Original author: Ralf Hielscher
- Developers: Rüdiger Kilian; Erik Wünsche; Bjarne Jacobsen; Felix Bartel; Frank Niessen
- Release: 2008
- Stable release: 7.1 / Nov. 2026
- Written in: MATLAB and Python
- License: GPL-2.0
- Website: mtex-toolbox.github.io
- Repository: github.com/mtex-toolbox/mtex

MTEX is an open-source MATLAB package specifically designed for the analysis of electron backscatter diffraction (EBSD) data, which are widely used to analyse the crystallographic orientation of materials at the microscale.

== History ==
The development of MTEX began in 2008, spearheaded by Ralf Hielscher, who aimed to create a user-friendly platform that could facilitate the analysis of large datasets generated by EBSD. The toolbox has since evolved, incorporating various features that allow for the manipulation and visualisation of crystallographic data.

EBSD allows for the mapping of crystallographic orientations in materials, providing insights into their microstructural properties. The integration of EBSD with MATLAB through MTEX has enabled researchers to perform advanced analyses, such as orientation distribution function (ODF) calculations, pole figure plotting, calculation of anisotropic physical properties from texture data, and grain boundary and grain reconstruction, which are crucial for understanding the mechanical properties of materials, as the crystallographic texture can significantly influence their behaviour under stress.

Moreover, the open-source nature of MTEX has fostered a collaborative environment among researchers, allowing for continuous improvements and updates to the toolbox. This community-driven approach has led to the incorporation of new features and functionalities.

MTEX's versatility is further demonstrated by its application across various fields, including geology, metallurgy, and materials science. In geological studies, for instance, MTEX has been used to analyse the crystallographic orientation of minerals, providing insights into their formation processes and the conditions under which they evolved. Similarly, in metallurgy, researchers have employed MTEX to investigate the effects of processing methods on the texture and grain boundary characteristics of alloys, which are critical for optimising their mechanical properties.

The toolbox has also been instrumental in advancing the understanding of deformation mechanisms in materials. By analysing EBSD data with MTEX, researchers can elucidate the relationship between microstructural features and mechanical behaviour, such as strain localisation and phase transformations during deformation.
