= Spatial frequency =

Characteristic of any structure that is periodic across a position in space

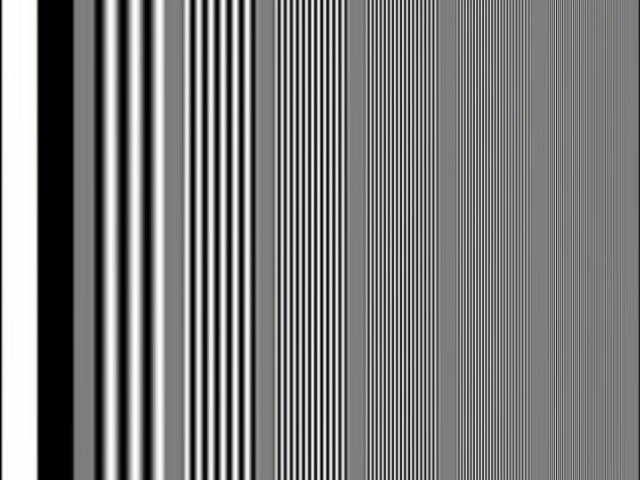
Pattern with from left to right stepwise increasing spatial frequency

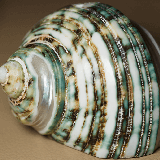
Green Sea Shell image

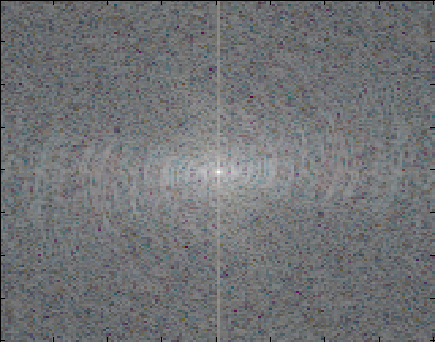
Spatial frequency representation of the Green Sea Shell image

Image and its spatial frequencies: Magnitude of frequency domain is logarithmically scaled, and zero frequency is in the center. The original image has been transformed to the frequency domain by means of a two-dimensional Discrete Fourier Transform. Notable is the clustering of the content on the lower frequencies, a typical property of natural images.

In mathematics, physics, and engineering, spatial frequency is a characteristic of any structure that is periodic across position in space. The spatial frequency is a measure of how often sinusoidal components (as determined by the Fourier transform) of the structure repeat per unit of distance.

The SI unit of spatial frequency is the reciprocal metre (m^{−1}), although cycles per meter (c/m) is also common. In image-processing applications, spatial frequency is often expressed in units of cycles per millimeter (c/mm) or also line pairs per millimeter (LP/mm).

In wave propagation, the spatial frequency is also known as wavenumber. Ordinary wavenumber is defined as the reciprocal of wavelength $\lambda$ and is commonly denoted by $\xi$ or sometimes $\nu$: $\xi = \frac{1}{\lambda}.$ Angular wavenumber $k$, expressed in rad per metre (rad/m), is related to ordinary wavenumber and wavelength by $k = 2 \pi \xi = \frac{2 \pi}{\lambda}.$

== Visual perception ==
In the study of visual perception, sinusoidal gratings are frequently used to probe the capabilities of the visual system, such as contrast sensitivity. In these stimuli, spatial frequency is expressed as the number of cycles per degree of visual angle. Sine-wave gratings also differ from one another in amplitude (the magnitude of difference in intensity between light and dark stripes), orientation, and phase.

=== Spatial-frequency theory ===
The spatial-frequency theory refers to the theory that the visual cortex operates on a code of spatial frequency, not on the code of straight edges and lines hypothesised by Hubel and Wiesel on the basis of early experiments on V1 neurons in the cat. In support of this theory is the experimental observation that the visual cortex neurons respond even more robustly to sine-wave gratings that are placed at specific angles in their receptive fields than they do to edges or bars. Most neurons in the primary visual cortex respond best when a sine-wave grating of a particular frequency is presented at a particular angle in a particular location in the visual field. (However, as noted by Teller (1984), it is probably not wise to treat the highest firing rate of a particular neuron as having a special significance with respect to its role in the perception of a particular stimulus, given that the neural code is known to be linked to relative firing rates. For example, in color coding by the three cones in the human retina, there is no special significance to the cone that is firing most strongly – what matters is the relative rate of firing of all three simultaneously. Teller (1984) similarly noted that a strong firing rate in response to a particular stimulus should not be interpreted as indicating that the neuron is somehow specialized for that stimulus, since there is an unlimited equivalence class of stimuli capable of producing similar firing rates.)

The spatial-frequency theory of vision is based on two physical principles:

- Any visual stimulus can be represented by plotting the intensity of the light along lines running through it.
- Any curve can be broken down into constituent sine waves by Fourier analysis.

The theory (for which empirical support has yet to be developed) states that in each functional module of the visual cortex, Fourier analysis (or its piecewise form) is performed on the receptive field and the neurons in each module are thought to respond selectively to various orientations and frequencies of sine wave gratings. When all of the visual cortex neurons that are influenced by a specific scene respond together, the perception of the scene is created by the summation of the various sine-wave gratings. (This procedure, however, does not address the problem of the organization of the products of the summation into figures, grounds, and so on. It effectively recovers the original (pre-Fourier analysis) distribution of photon intensity and wavelengths across the retinal projection, but does not add information to this original distribution. So the functional value of such a hypothesized procedure is unclear. Some other objections to the "Fourier theory" are discussed by Westheimer (2001)). One is generally not aware of the individual spatial frequency components since all of the elements are essentially blended together into one smooth representation. However, computer-based filtering procedures can be used to deconstruct an image into its individual spatial frequency components. Research on spatial frequency detection by visual neurons complements and extends previous research using straight edges rather than refuting it.

Further research shows that different spatial frequencies convey different information about the appearance of a stimulus. High spatial frequencies represent abrupt spatial changes in the image, such as edges, and generally correspond to featural information and fine detail. M. Bar (2004) has proposed that low spatial frequencies represent global information about the shape, such as general orientation and proportions. Rapid and specialised perception of faces is known to rely more on low spatial frequency information. In the general population of adults, the threshold for spatial frequency discrimination is about 7%. It is often poorer in dyslexic individuals.

== Spatial frequency in MRI ==
When spatial frequency is used as a variable in a mathematical function, the function is said to be in k-space. Two dimensional k-space has been introduced into MRI as a raw data storage space. The value of each data point in k-space is measured in the unit of 1/meter, i.e. the unit of spatial frequency.

It is very common that the raw data in k-space shows features of periodic functions. The periodicity is not spatial frequency, but is temporal frequency. An MRI raw data matrix is composed of a series of phase-variable spin-echo signals. Each of the spin-echo signal is a sinc function of time, which can be described by
$$\text{Spin-Echo} = \frac {M_\mathrm{0}\sin \omega_\mathrm{r}t}{\omega_\mathrm{r}t}$$
Where
$$\omega_\mathrm{r}=\omega_\mathrm{0} + \bar{\gamma} rG$$
Here $\bar{\gamma}$ is the gyromagnetic ratio constant, and $\omega_\mathrm{0}$ is the basic resonance frequency of the spin. Due to the presence of the gradient G, the spatial information r is encoded onto the frequency $\omega$. The periodicity seen in the MRI raw data is just this frequency $\omega_\mathrm{r}$, which is basically the temporal frequency in nature.

In a rotating frame, $\omega_\mathrm{0}=0$, and $\omega_\mathrm{r}$ is simplified to $\bar{\gamma} rG$. Just by letting $k= \bar{\gamma} Gt$, the spin-echo signal is expressed in an alternative form
$$\text{Spin-Echo} = \frac {M_\mathrm{0}\sin rk}{rk}$$

Now, the spin-echo signal is in the k-space. It becomes a periodic function of k with r as the k-space frequency but not as the "spatial frequency", since "spatial frequency" is reserved for the name of the periodicity seen in the real space r.

The k-space domain and the space domain form a Fourier pair. Two pieces of information are found in each domain, the spatial information and the spatial frequency information. The spatial information, which is of great interest to all medical doctors, is seen as periodic functions in the k-space domain and is seen as the image in the space domain. The spatial frequency information, which might be of interest to some MRI engineers, is not easily seen in the space domain but is readily seen as the data points in the k-space domain.

== See also ==
- Fourier analysis
- Superlens
- Visual perception
- Fringe visibility
- Reciprocal space
