= Bravais lattice =

Geometry and crystallography point array

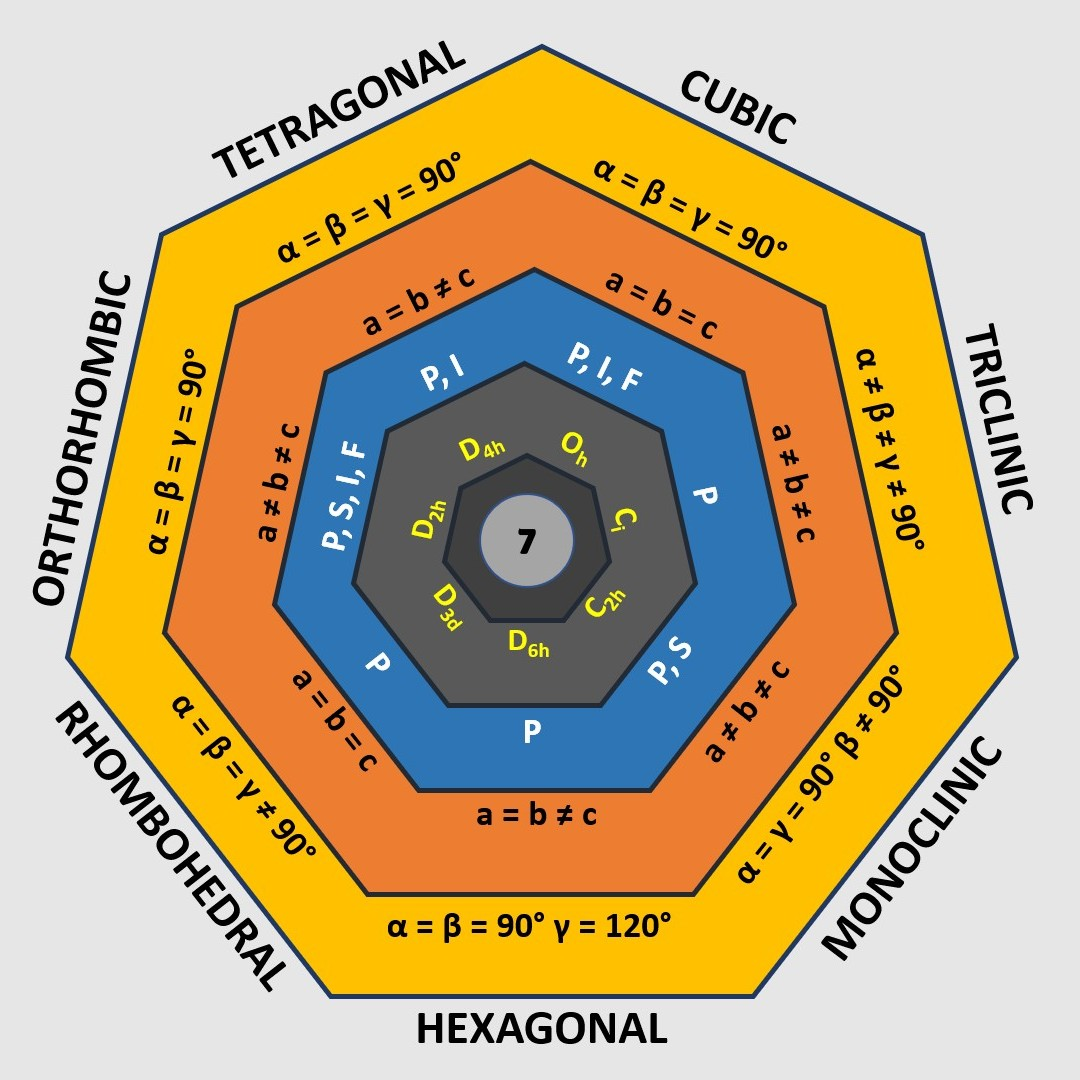
The seven lattice systems and their Bravais lattices in three dimensions. The inner heptagons indicate the lattice angles, lattice parameters, Bravais lattices and Schöenflies notations for the respective lattice systems.

In geometry and crystallography, a Bravais lattice, named after Auguste Bravais (1850), is an infinite array of discrete points generated by a set of discrete translation operations, where the lattice is exactly the same from each of the discrete lattice points.

The set of translation operations is described in three dimensional space by

$$\mathbf{R} = n_1 \mathbf{a}_1 + n_2 \mathbf{a}_2 + n_3 \mathbf{a}_3,$$

where the n_{i} are any integers, and a_{i} are primitive translation vectors, or primitive vectors, which lie in different directions (not necessarily mutually perpendicular) and span the lattice. The choice of primitive vectors for a given Bravais lattice is not unique.

The Bravais lattice concept is used to formally define a crystalline arrangement and its (finite) frontiers. A crystal is made up of one or more atoms, called the basis or motif, at each lattice point. The basis may consist of atoms, molecules, or polymer strings of solid matter, and the lattice provides the locations of the basis.

Two Bravais lattices are often considered equivalent if they have isomorphic symmetry groups. In this sense, there are 5 possible Bravais lattices in 2-dimensional space and 14 possible Bravais lattices in 3-dimensional space. The 14 possible symmetry groups of Bravais lattices are 14 of the 230 space groups. In the context of the space group classification, the Bravais lattices are also called Bravais classes, Bravais arithmetic classes, or Bravais flocks.

== Unit cell ==
The unit cell comprises the space between adjacent lattice points as well as any atoms in that space, which when translated fills the lattice space without overlapping or voids. The unit cell takes the shape of an n-dimensional parallelotope, which is a parallelogram in two-dimensions and a parallelepiped in three-dimensions.

There two main types of unit cells: primitive cells and conventional cells.

A primitive cell is the smallest possible unit cell that can be repeated to reproduce the whole lattice. It contains exactly one lattice point.

The primitive cell does not always show the clear symmetry of a given lattice, in which case a conventional cell can be used. A conventional cell is the smallest unit cell with the full symmetry of the lattice. The number of lattice points, as well as the volume of the conventional cell is an integer multiple (1, 2, 3, or 4) of that of the primitive cell, with the additional lattice points occupying centering positions within the conventional cell.

== In 2 dimensions ==
In two-dimensional space there are 5 Bravais lattices, grouped into four lattice systems, shown in the table below.

Note: In the unit cell diagrams in the following table the lattice points are depicted using black circles and the unit cells are depicted using parallelograms (which may be squares or rectangles) outlined in black. Although each of the four corners of each parallelogram connects to a lattice point, only one of the four lattice points technically belongs to a given unit cell and each of the other three lattice points belongs to one of the adjacent unit cells. This can be seen by imagining moving the unit cell parallelogram slightly left and slightly down while leaving all the black circles of the lattice points fixed.

Lattice system	Axis constraints	5 Bravais lattices (Pearson symbol)	
Lattice system	Axis constraints	Primitive	Centered
Oblique (monoclinic)		mp	
Rectangular (orthorhombic)	θ = 90°	op	oc
Square (tetragonal)	a = b θ = 90°	tp	
Hexagonal	a = b θ = 120°	hp	

The unit cells are specified according to the relative lengths of the cell edges (a and b) and the angle between them (θ). The area of the unit cell can be calculated by evaluating the norm ‖a × b‖, where a and b are the lattice vectors. The properties of the lattice systems are given below:

Lattice system	Area	Point group (Hermann-Mauguin)
Monoclinic	$ab \, \sin\theta$	$2$
Orthorhombic	$ab$	$2mm$
Tetragonal	$a^2$	$4mm$
Hexagonal	$\frac{\sqrt{3}}{2}\, a^2$	$6mm$

== In 3 dimensions ==
2×2×2 unit cells of a diamond cubic lattice

In three-dimensional space there are 14 Bravais lattices. These are obtained by combining one of the seven lattice systems with one of the centering types. The centering types identify the locations of the lattice points in the unit cell as follows:

- Primitive (P): lattice points on the cell corners only (sometimes called simple)
- Base-centered (S: A, B, or C): lattice points on the cell corners with one additional point at the center of each face of one pair of parallel faces of the cell (sometimes called end-centered)
- Body-centered (I): lattice points on the cell corners, with one additional point at the center of the cell
- Face-centered (F): lattice points on the cell corners, with one additional point at the center of each of the faces of the cell

Not all combinations of lattice systems and centering types are needed to describe all of the possible lattices, as it can be shown that several of these are in fact equivalent to each other. For example, the monoclinic I lattice can be described by a monoclinic C lattice by different choice of crystal axes. Similarly, all A- or B-centred lattices can be described either by a C- or P-centering. This reduces the number of combinations to 14 conventional Bravais lattices, shown in the table below.

Note: In the unit cell diagrams in the following table all the lattice points on the cell boundary (corners and faces) are shown; however, not all of these lattice points technically belong to the given unit cell. Only one of the eight corner lattice points belongs to the given unit cell and the other seven lattice points belong to adjacent unit cells. This can be seen by imagining moving the unit cell slightly left, slightly down, and slightly out of the screen while keeping the lattice points fixed. In addition, only one of the two lattice points shown on the top and bottom face in the Base-centered column belongs to the given unit cell. Finally, only three of the six lattice points on the faces in the Face-centered column belong to the given unit cell.

Crystal family	Lattice system	Axis constraints	14 Bravais lattices (Pearson symbol)			
Crystal family	Lattice system	Axis constraints	Primitive	Base-centered	Body-centered	Face-centered
Triclinic			aP			
Monoclinic		α = γ = 90°	mP	mS		
Orthorhombic		α = β = γ = 90°	oP	oS	oI	oF
Tetragonal		a = b α = β = γ = 90°	tP		tI	
Hexagonal	Rhombohedral	a = b = c α = β = γ	hR			
Hexagonal	Hexagonal	a = b α = β = 90°, γ = 120°	hP			
Cubic		a = b = c α = β = γ = 90°	cP		cI	cF

The unit cells are specified according to six lattice parameters which are the relative lengths of the cell edges (a, b, c) and the angles between them (α, β, γ), where α is the angle between b and c, β is the angle between a and c, and γ is the angle between a and b. The volume of the unit cell can be calculated by evaluating the triple product a · (b × c), where a, b, and c are the lattice vectors. The properties of the lattice systems are given below:

Crystal family	Lattice system	Volume	Point group (Hermann-Mauguin)	Corresponding examples
Triclinic		$abc \sqrt{1-\cos^2\alpha-\cos^2\beta-\cos^2\gamma+2\cos\alpha \cos\beta \cos\gamma}$	$\bar{1}$	K_{2}Cr_{2}O_{7}, CuSO_{4}·5H_{2}O, H_{3}BO_{3}
Monoclinic		$abc \, \sin\beta$	$2/m$	Monoclinic sulphur, Na_{2}SO_{4}·10H_{2}O, PbCrO_{3}
Orthorhombic		$abc$	$mmm$	Rhombic sulphur, KNO_{3}, BaSO_{4}
Tetragonal		$a^2c$	$4/mmm$	White tin, SnO_{2}, TiO_{2}, CaSO_{4}
Hexagonal	Rhombohedral	$a^3 \sqrt{1 - 3\cos^2\alpha + 2\cos^3\alpha}$	$\bar{3} m$	Calcite (CaCO_{3}), cinnabar (HgS)
Hexagonal	Hexagonal	$\frac{\sqrt{3}}{2}\, a^2c$	$6/mmm$	Graphite, ZnO, CdS
Cubic		$a^3$	$m \bar{3} m$	NaCl, zincblende, copper metal, KCl, Diamond, Silver

== In 4 dimensions ==
In four dimensions, there are 64 Bravais lattices, grouped into 23 crystal families and 33 lattice systems. Of these, 23 are primitive and 41 are centered. 10 Bravais lattices, marked with an asterisk, split into enantiomorphic pairs.

The four-dimensional unit cell is defined by four edge lengths (a, b, c, d) and six interaxial angles (α, β, γ, δ, ε, ζ).

Crystal family	Lattice system	64 Bravais lattices	Edge lengths	Interaxial angles
Hexaclinic		P	a ≠ b ≠ c ≠ d	α ≠ β ≠ γ ≠ δ ≠ ε ≠ ζ ≠ 90°
Triclinic		P, S	a ≠ b ≠ c ≠ d	α ≠ β ≠ γ ≠ 90° δ = ε = ζ = 90°
Diclinic		P, S, D	a ≠ b ≠ c ≠ d	α ≠ 90° β = γ = δ = ε = 90° ζ ≠ 90°
Monoclinic		P, S, S, I, D, F	a ≠ b ≠ c ≠ d	α ≠ 90° β = γ = δ = ε = ζ = 90°
Orthogonal	(K)	KU	a ≠ b ≠ c ≠ d	α = β = γ = δ = ε = ζ = 90°
Orthogonal	(P)	P, S, I, Z, D, F, G, U	a ≠ b ≠ c ≠ d	α = β = γ = δ = ε = ζ = 90°
Tetragonal monoclinic		P, I	a ≠ b = c ≠ d	α ≠ 90° β = γ = δ = ε = ζ = 90°
Hexagonal monoclinic	(R)	R	a ≠ b = c ≠ d	α ≠ 90° β = γ = δ = ε = 90° ζ = 120°
Hexagonal monoclinic	(P)	P	a ≠ b = c ≠ d	α ≠ 90° β = γ = δ = ε = 90° ζ = 120°
Ditetragonal diclinic		P*	a = d ≠ b = c	α = ζ = 90° β = ε ≠ 90° γ ≠ 90° δ = 180° − γ
Ditrigonal (dihexagonal) diclinic		P*	a = d ≠ b = c	α = ζ = 120° β = ε ≠ 90° γ ≠ δ ≠ 90° cos δ = cos β − cos γ
Tetragonal orthogonal	(K)	KG	a ≠ b = c ≠ d	α = β = γ = δ = ε = ζ = 90°
Tetragonal orthogonal	(P)	P, S, I, Z, G	a ≠ b = c ≠ d	α = β = γ = δ = ε = ζ = 90°
Hexagonal orthogonal	(R)	R, RS	a ≠ b = c ≠ d	α = β = γ = δ = ε = 90°, ζ = 120°
Hexagonal orthogonal	(P)	P, S	a ≠ b = c ≠ d	α = β = γ = δ = ε = 90°, ζ = 120°
Ditetragonal monoclinic		P*, S*, D*	a = d ≠ b = c	α = γ = δ = ζ = 90° β = ε ≠ 90°
Ditrigonal (dihexagonal) monoclinic		P*, RR*	a = d ≠ b = c	α = ζ = 120° β = ε ≠ 90° γ = δ ≠ 90° cos γ = −1/2cos β
Ditetragonal orthogonal	(Crypto)	D	a = d ≠ b = c	α = β = γ = δ = ε = ζ = 90°
Ditetragonal orthogonal	(P)	P, Z	a = d ≠ b = c	α = β = γ = δ = ε = ζ = 90°
Hexagonal tetragonal		P	a = d ≠ b = c	α = β = γ = δ = ε = 90° ζ = 120°
Dihexagonal orthogonal	(Crypto)	G*	a = d ≠ b = c	α = ζ = 120° β = γ = δ = ε = 90°
Dihexagonal orthogonal	(P)	P	a = d ≠ b = c	α = ζ = 120° β = γ = δ = ε = 90°
Dihexagonal orthogonal	(R)	RR	a = d ≠ b = c	α = ζ = 120° β = γ = δ = ε = 90°
Cubic orthogonal	(Simple)	KU	a = b = c ≠ d	α = β = γ = δ = ε = ζ = 90°
Cubic orthogonal	(Complex)	P, I, Z, F, U	a = b = c ≠ d	α = β = γ = δ = ε = ζ = 90°
Octagonal		P*	a = b = c = d	α = γ = ζ ≠ 90° β = ε = 90° δ = 180° − α
Decagonal		P	a = b = c = d	α = γ = ζ ≠ β = δ = ε cos β = −1/2 − cos α
Dodecagonal		P*	a = b = c = d	α = ζ = 90° β = ε = 120° γ = δ ≠ 90°
Diisohexagonal orthogonal	(Simple)	RR	a = b = c = d	α = ζ = 120° β = γ = δ = ε = 90°
Diisohexagonal orthogonal	(Complex)	P	a = b = c = d	α = ζ = 120° β = γ = δ = ε = 90°
Icosagonal (icosahedral)		P, SN	a = b = c = d	α = β = γ = δ = ε = ζ cos α = −1/4
Hypercubic	(Octagonal)	P	a = b = c = d	α = β = γ = δ = ε = ζ = 90°
Hypercubic	(Dodecagonal)	Z	a = b = c = d	α = β = γ = δ = ε = ζ = 90°

The names here are given according to Whittaker. They are almost the same as in Brown et al., with exception for names of ditrigonal (dihexagonal) diclinic, ditrigonal (dihexagonal) monoclinic and icosagonal (icosahedral). The names for these three families according to Brown et al. are given in parentheses.

== See also ==
- Crystal habit
- Crystal system
- einstein problem
- Geometrical crystallography before X-rays
- Miller index
- Reciprocal lattice
- Translation operator (quantum mechanics)
- Translational symmetry
- Zone axis
