= Dodecahedron =

Polyhedron with 12 faces

Common dodecahedra
I_{h}, order 120
Regular	Small stellated	Great	Great stellated
T_{h}, order 24	T, order 12	O_{h}, order 48	Johnson (J_{84})
Pyritohedron	Tetartoid	Rhombic	Triangular
D_{4h}, order 16		D_{3h}, order 12	
Rhombo-hexagonal	Rhombo-square	Trapezo-rhombic	Rhombo-triangular

In geometry, a dodecahedron (Note: From Ancient Greek δωδεκάεδρον (dōdekáedron); from δώδεκα (dṓdeka) 'twelve' and ἕδρα (hédra) 'base, seat, face').) or duodecahedron is any polyhedron with twelve flat faces. The most familiar dodecahedron is the regular dodecahedron with regular pentagons as faces, which is a Platonic solid. There are also three regular star dodecahedra, which are constructed as stellations of the convex form. All of these have icosahedral symmetry, order 120.

Some dodecahedra have the same combinatorial structure as the regular dodecahedron (in terms of the graph formed by its vertices and edges), but their pentagonal faces are not regular: The pyritohedron, a common crystal form in pyrite, has pyritohedral symmetry, while the tetartoid has tetrahedral symmetry.

The rhombic dodecahedron can be seen as a limiting case of the pyritohedron, and it has octahedral symmetry. The elongated dodecahedron and trapezo-rhombic dodecahedron variations, along with the rhombic dodecahedra, are space-filling. There are numerous other dodecahedra.

While the regular dodecahedron shares many features with other Platonic solids, one unique property of it is that one can start at a corner of the surface and draw an infinite number of straight lines across the figure that return to the original point without crossing over any other corner.

== Regular dodecahedron ==
The regular dodecahedron is a convex polyhedron with regular pentagonal faces, three meeting at each vertex. It has 12 faces, 30 edges, and 20 vertices. It is one of the five regular Platonic solids, named after Plato who described them and considered the other four to symbolize the classical elements; he assigned the regular dodecahedron to the cosmos. Its dual is the regular icosahedron.

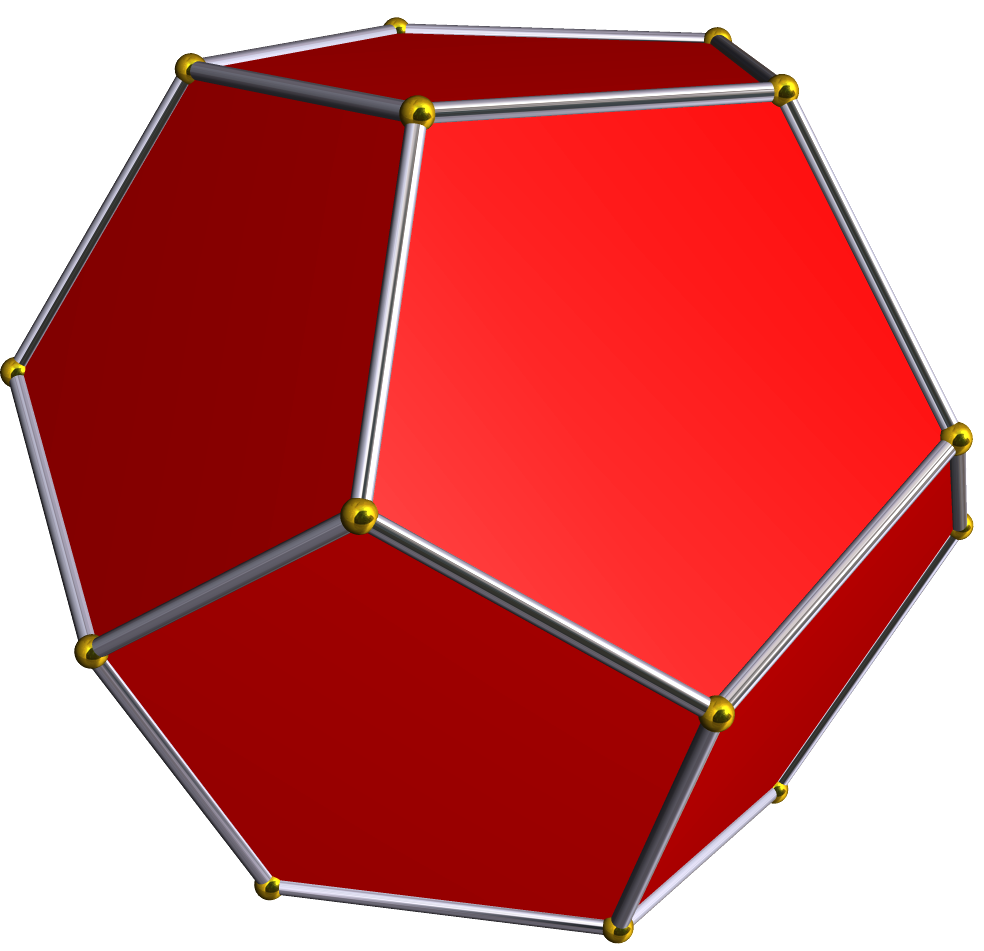
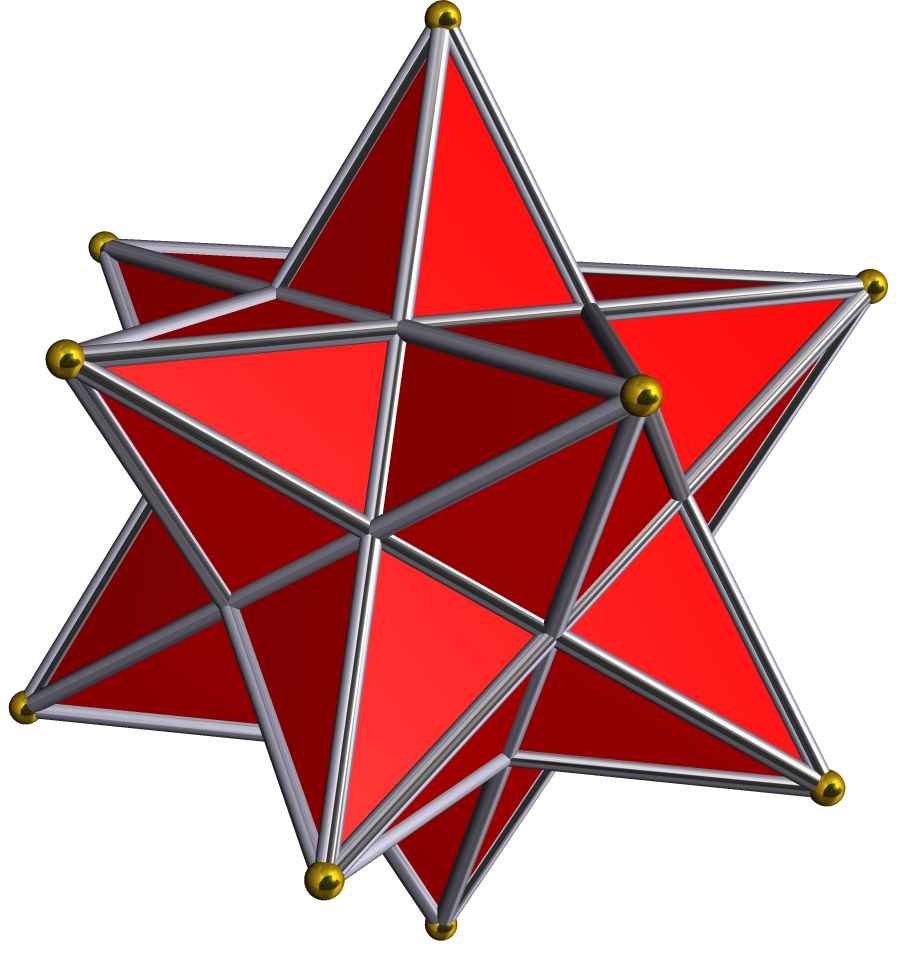
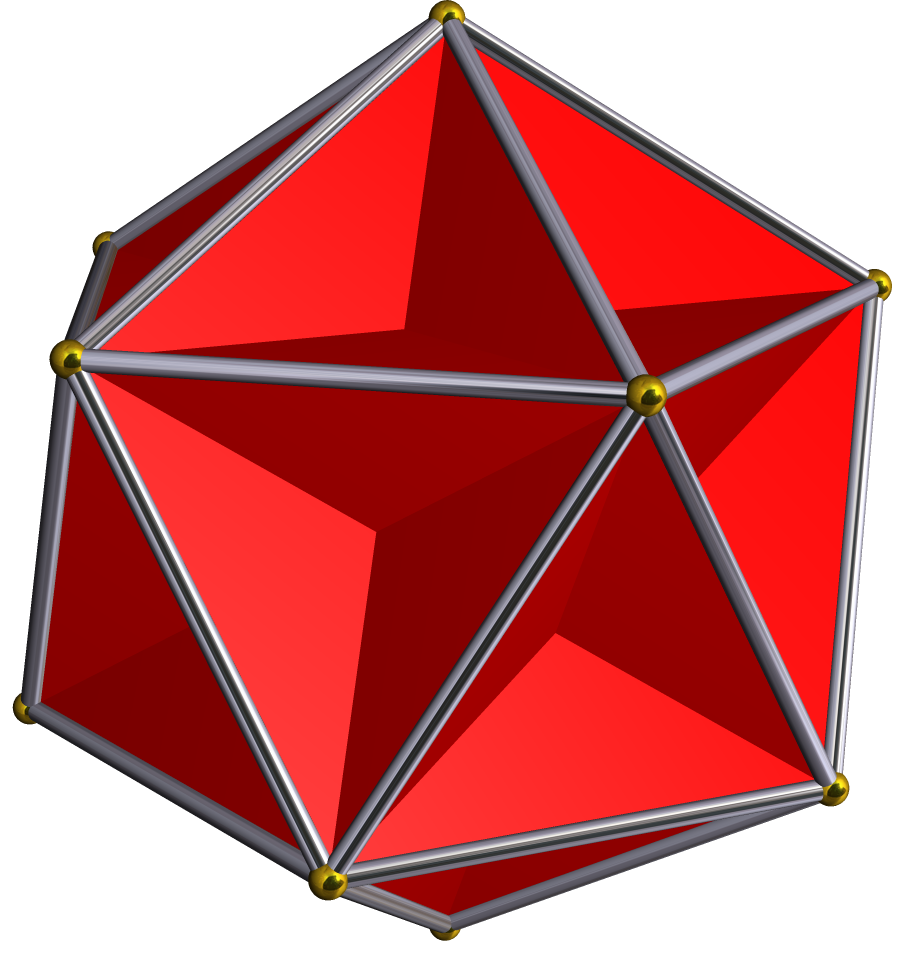
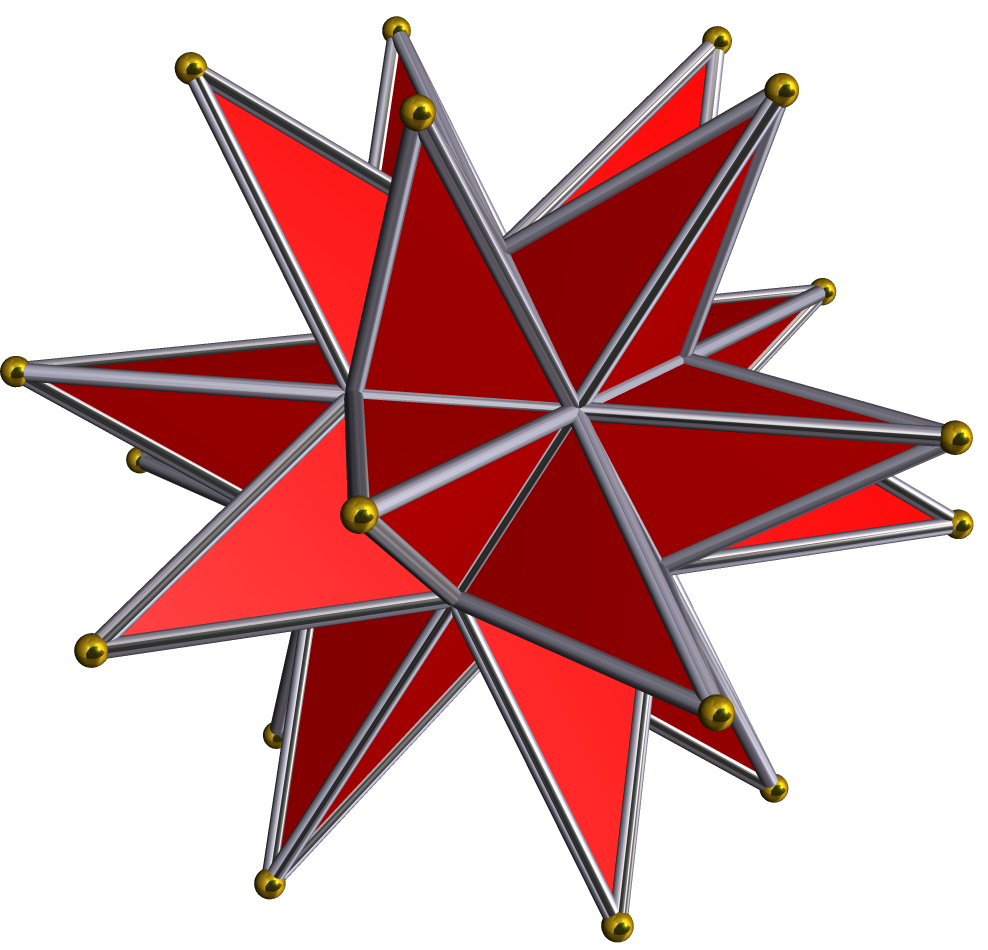
Left to right: Regular dodecahedron, small stellated dodecahedron, great dodecahedron, great stellated dodecahedron

The regular dodecahedron has three stellations, all of which are regular star dodecahedra. They form three of the four Kepler–Poinsot polyhedra. They are the small stellated dodecahedron, the great dodecahedron, and the great stellated dodecahedron. The small stellated dodecahedron and great dodecahedron are dual to each other; the great stellated dodecahedron is dual to the great icosahedron. All of these regular star dodecahedra have regular pentagonal or pentagrammic faces. The convex regular dodecahedron and great stellated dodecahedron are different realisations of the same abstract regular polyhedron; the small stellated dodecahedron and great dodecahedron are different realisations of another abstract regular polyhedron.

While the three star forms satisfy the requirements for regularity and have twelve faces, and therefore any of them could also be referred to as a "regular dodecahedron", this specific term is exclusively reserved for the first, convex form. A fifth shape which could be classified as a regular dodecahedron, namely the dodecagonal hosohedron, is also not referred to as such, in part because it exists only as a spherical polyhedron and is degenerate in Euclidean space.

== Other pentagonal dodecahedra ==
In crystallography, two important dodecahedra can occur as crystal forms in some symmetry classes of the cubic crystal system that are topologically equivalent to the regular dodecahedron but less symmetrical: the pyritohedron with pyritohedral symmetry, and the tetartoid with tetrahedral symmetry:

=== Pyritohedron ===
Pyritohedron

A pyritohedron (or pentagonal dodecahedron) is a dodecahedron with pyritohedral symmetry T_{h}. Like the regular dodecahedron, it has twelve identical pentagonal faces, with three meeting in each of the 20 vertices. However, the pentagons are not constrained to be regular, and the underlying atomic arrangement has no true fivefold symmetry axis. Its 30 edges are divided into two sets, containing 24 and 6 edges of the same length. The only axes of rotational symmetry are three mutually perpendicular twofold axes and four threefold axes.

Although regular dodecahedra do not exist in crystals, the pyritohedron form occurs in the crystals of the mineral pyrite, and it may be an inspiration for the discovery of the regular Platonic solid form. The true regular dodecahedron can occur as a shape for quasicrystals (such as holmium–magnesium–zinc quasicrystal) with icosahedral symmetry, which includes true fivefold rotation axes.

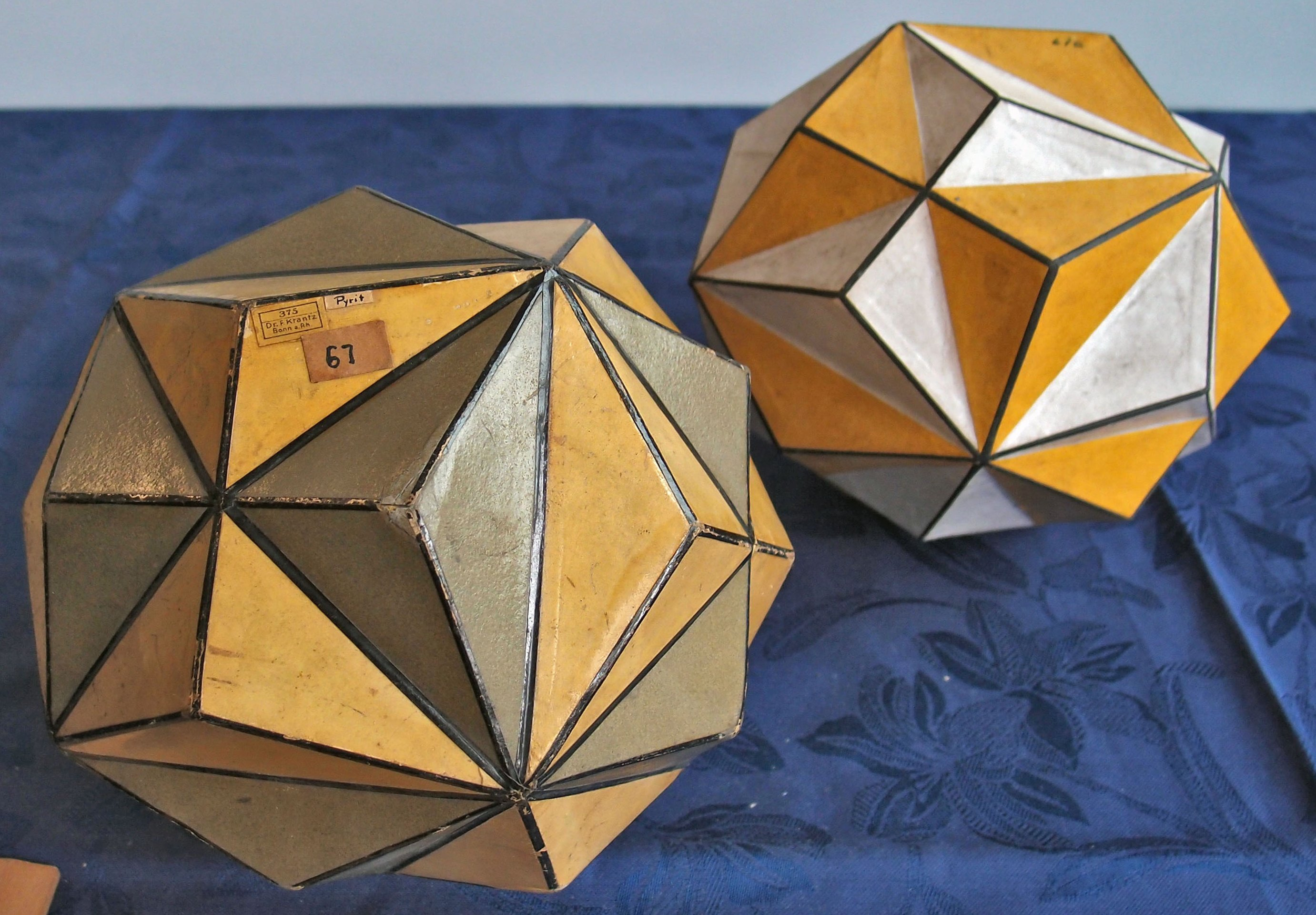
Dual positions in pyrite crystal models

==== Crystal pyrite ====
The name crystal pyrite comes from one of the two common crystal habits shown by pyrite (the other one being the cube). In pyritohedral pyrite, the faces have a Miller index of (210), which means that the dihedral angle is 2·arctan(2) ≈ 126.87° and each pentagonal face has one angle of approximately 121.6° in between two angles of approximately 106.6° and opposite two angles of approximately 102.6°. The following formulas show the measurements for the face of a perfect crystal (which is rarely found in nature).

$\text{Height} = \frac{\sqrt{5}}{2} \cdot \text{Long side}$

$\text{Width} = \frac{4}{3} \cdot \text{Long side}$

$\text{Short sides} = \sqrt{\frac{7}{12}} \cdot \text{Long side}$

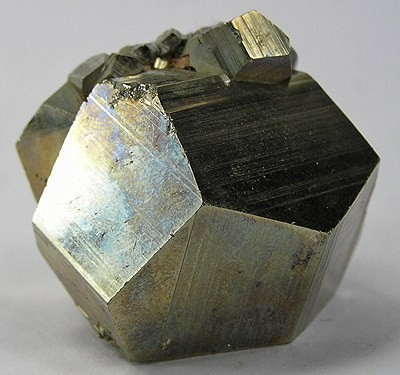
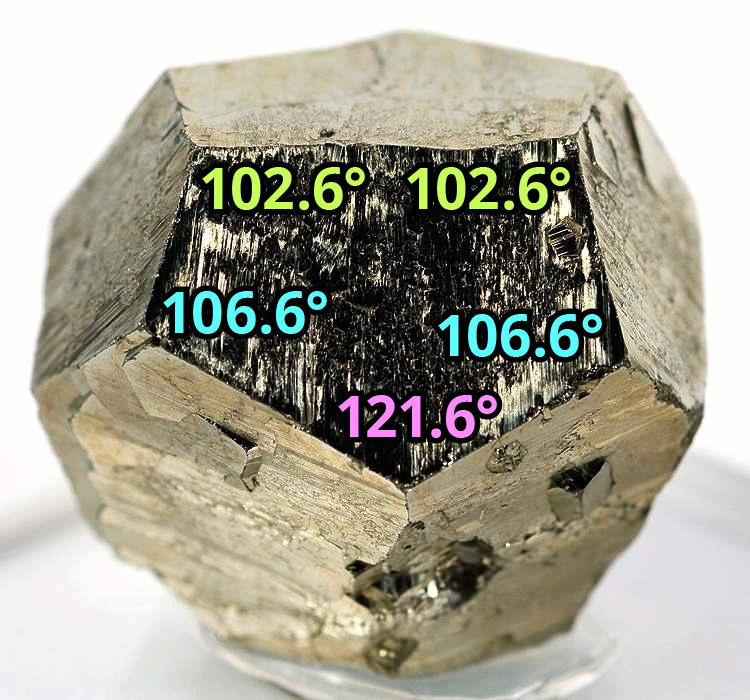
Natural pyrite (with face angles on the right)

==== Cartesian coordinates ====
The eight vertices of a cube have the coordinates (±1, ±1, ±1).

The coordinates of the 12 additional vertices are

- (0, ±(1 + h), ±(1 − h^{2})),
- (±(1 + h), ±(1 − h^{2}), 0) and
- (±(1 − h^{2}), 0, ±(1 + h)).

h is the height of the wedge-shaped "roof" above the faces of that cube with edge length 2.

An important case is h = 1/2 (a quarter of the cube edge length) for perfect natural pyrite (also the pyritohedron in the Weaire–Phelan structure).

Another one is h = 1/φ = 0.618... for the regular dodecahedron. See section Geometric freedom for other cases.

Two pyritohedra with swapped nonzero coordinates are in dual positions to each other like the dodecahedra in the compound of two dodecahedra.

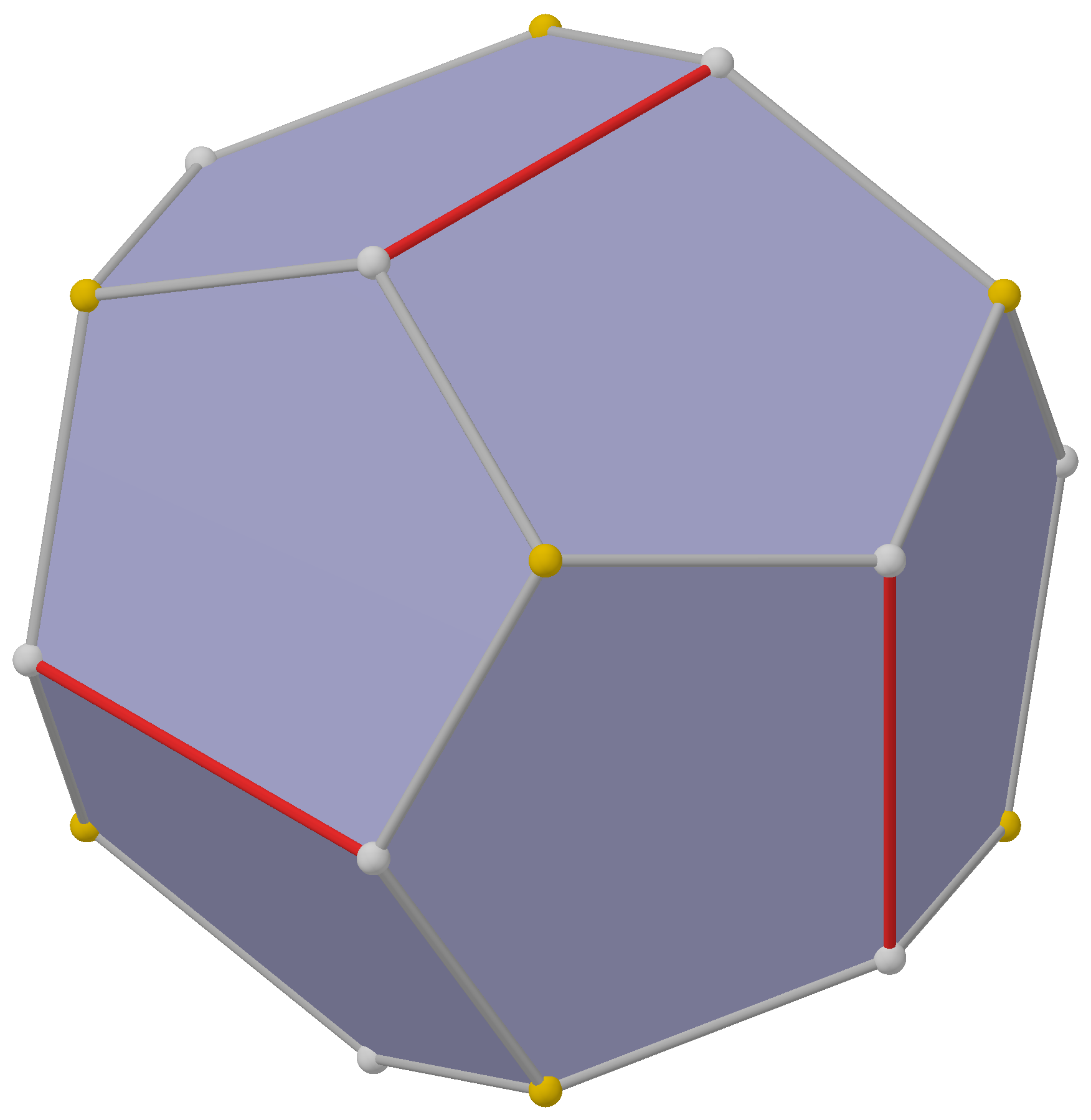
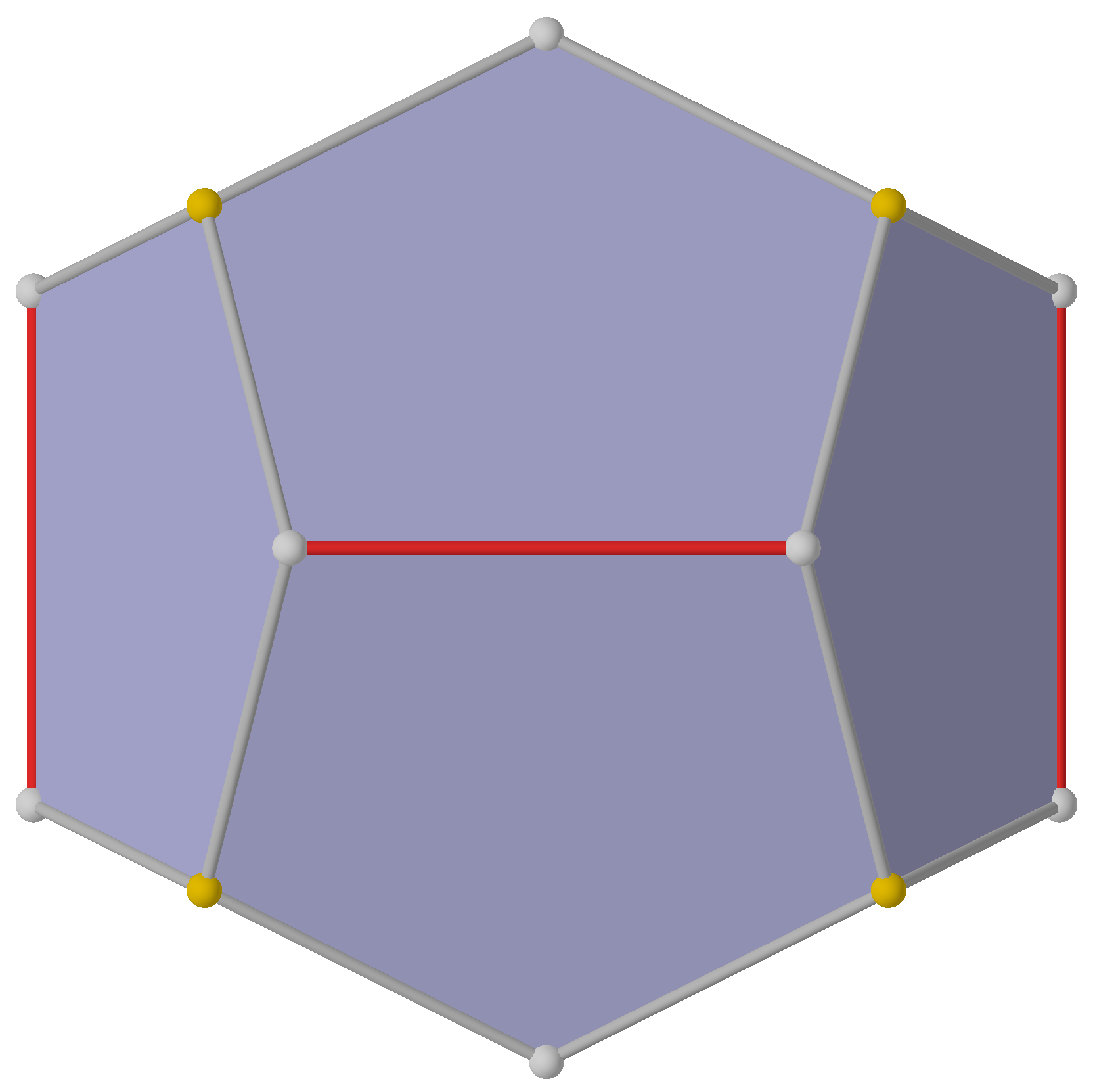
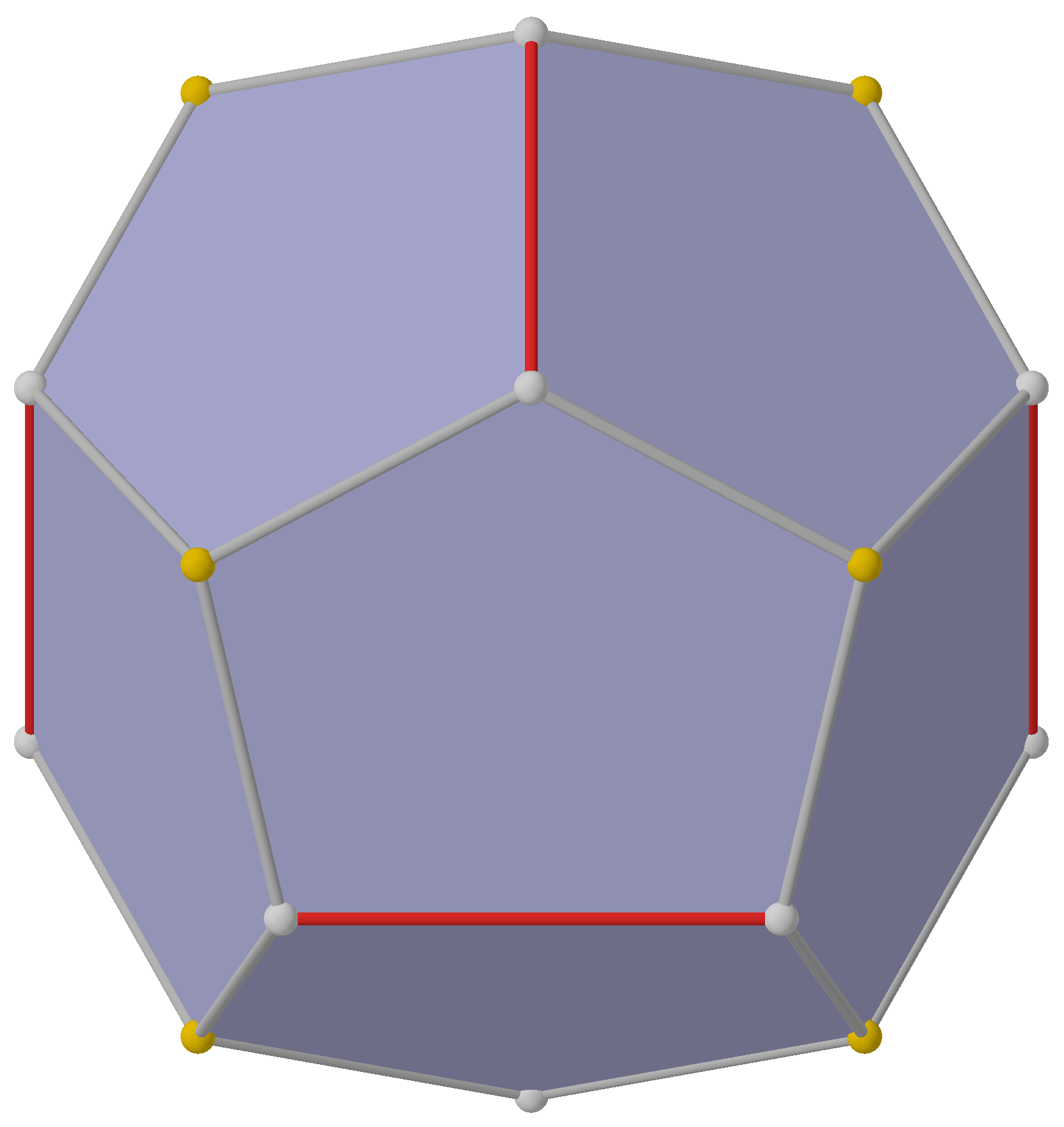
Orthographic projections of the pyritohedron with h = 1/2

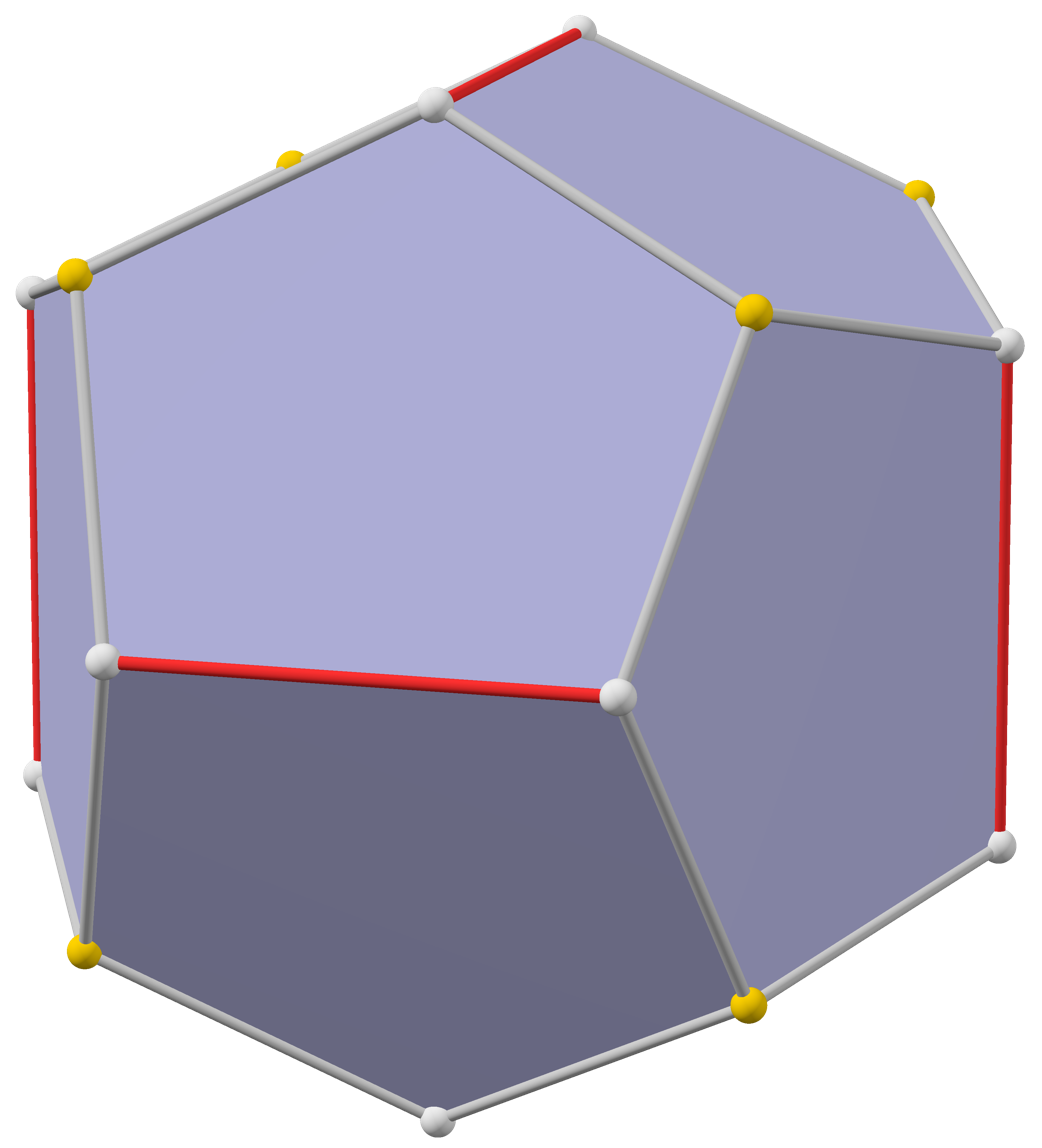
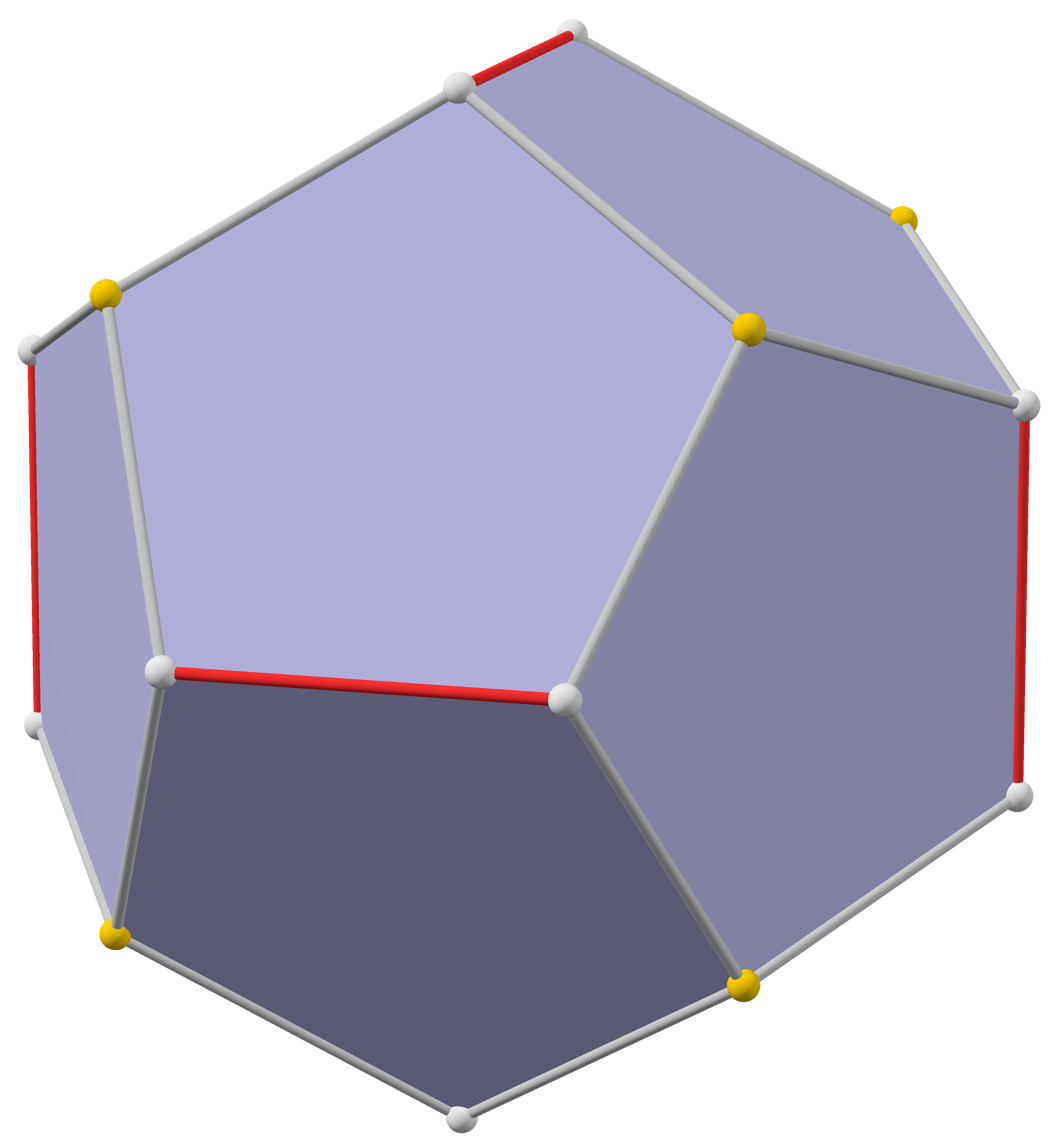
Heights 1/2 and 1/φ

The body of the dodecahedron can also be described as an intersection of twelve half-spaces,

$$\{ (x,y,z) \in \mathbb{R}^3 \mid \| (x,y,z) \|_D \le 1 \}$$

where

$$\| (x,y,z) \|_D
=
\max \Big\{
|\alpha x + \beta z|,\
|\alpha x - \beta z|,\
|\alpha y + \beta x|,\
|\alpha y - \beta x|,\
|\alpha z + \beta y|,\
|\alpha z - \beta y|
\Big\}$$

and

$\alpha = \frac{3-\sqrt{5}}{2}, \qquad \beta = \frac{\sqrt{5}-1}{2} = \frac{1}{\varphi}.$

Animations
Honeycomb of alternating convex and concave pyritohedra with heights between ±1/φ	Heights between 0 (cube) and 1 (rhombic dodecahedron)

==== Geometric freedom ====
The pyritohedron has a geometric degree of freedom with limiting cases of a cubic convex hull at one limit of collinear edges, and a rhombic dodecahedron as the other limit as 6 edges are degenerated to length zero. The regular dodecahedron represents a special intermediate case where all edges and angles are equal.

It is possible to go past these limiting cases, creating concave or nonconvex pyritohedra. The endo-dodecahedron is concave and equilateral; it can tessellate space with the convex regular dodecahedron. Continuing from there in that direction, we pass through a degenerate case where twelve vertices coincide in the centre, and on to the regular great stellated dodecahedron where all edges and angles are equal again, and the faces have been distorted into regular pentagrams. On the other side, past the rhombic dodecahedron, we get a nonconvex equilateral dodecahedron with fish-shaped self-intersecting equilateral pentagonal faces.

Special cases of the pyritohedron
Versions with equal absolute values and opposing signs form a honeycomb together. (Compare this animation.); The ratio shown is that of edge lengths, namely those in a set of 24 (touching cube vertices) to those in a set of 6 (corresponding to cube faces).
Ratio	1 : 1	0 : 1	1 : 1	2 : 1	1 : 1	0 : 1	1 : 1
h	−(√5 + 1)/2	−1	(−√5 + 1)/2	0	(√5 − 1)/2	1	(√5 + 1)/2
h	−1.618...	−1	−0.618...	0	0.618...	1	1.618...
Image	Regular star, great stellated dodecahedron, with regular pentagram faces	Degenerate, 12 vertices in the center	The concave equilateral dodecahedron, called an endo-dodecahedron.	A cube can be divided into a pyritohedron by bisecting all the edges, and faces in alternate directions.	A regular dodecahedron is an intermediate case with equal edge lengths.	A rhombic dodecahedron is a degenerate case with the 6 crossedges reduced to length zero.	Self-intersecting equilateral dodecahedron

=== Tetartoid ===
Tetartoid

A tetartoid (also tetragonal pentagonal dodecahedron, pentagon-tritetrahedron, and tetrahedric pentagon dodecahedron) is a dodecahedron with chiral tetrahedral symmetry (T). Like the regular dodecahedron, it has twelve identical pentagonal faces, with three meeting in each of the 20 vertices. However, the pentagons are not regular and the figure has no fivefold symmetry axes.

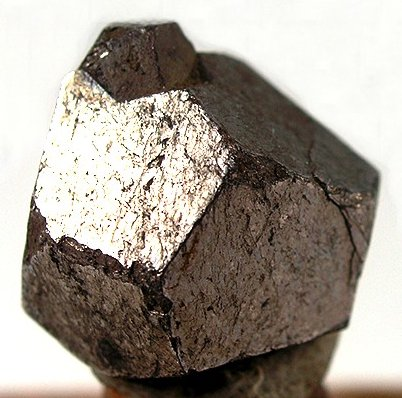
Cobaltite

Although regular dodecahedra do not exist in crystals, the tetartoid form does. The name tetartoid comes from the Greek root for one-fourth because it has one fourth of full octahedral symmetry, and half of pyritohedral symmetry. The mineral cobaltite can have this symmetry form.

Abstractions sharing the solid's topology and symmetry can be created from the cube and the tetrahedron. In the cube each face is bisected by a slanted edge. In the tetrahedron each edge is trisected, and each of the new vertices connected to a face center. (In Conway polyhedron notation this is a gyro tetrahedron.)

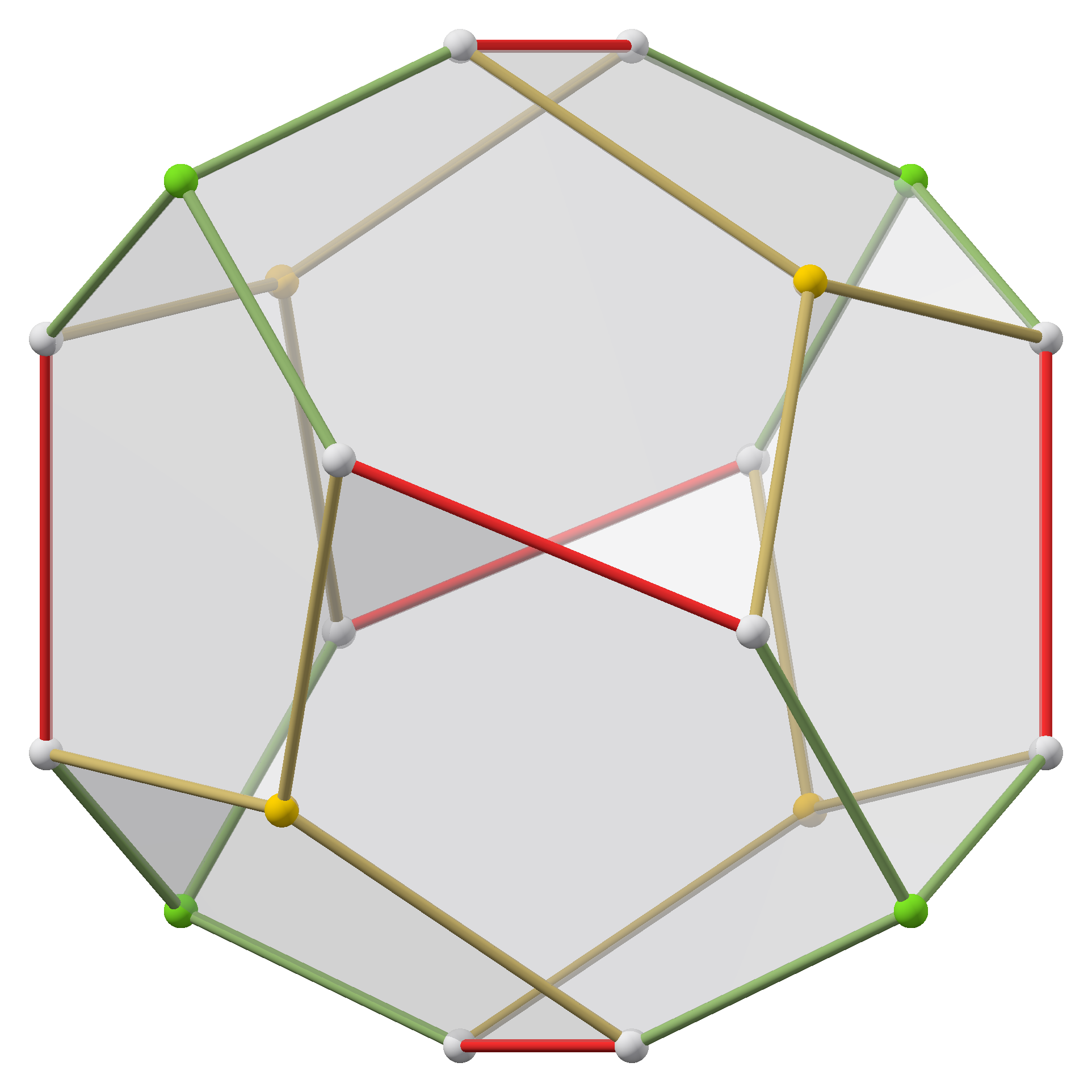
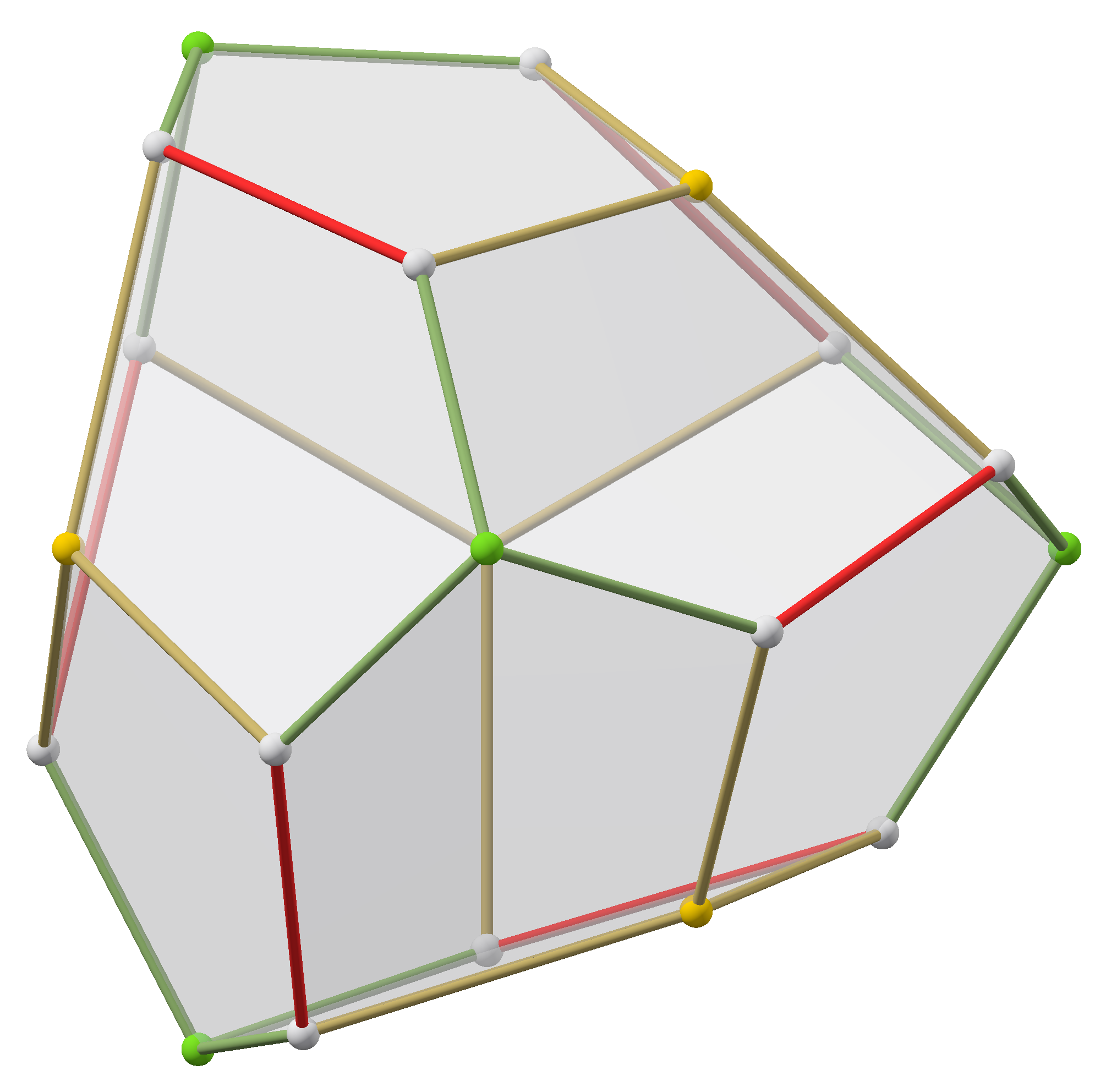
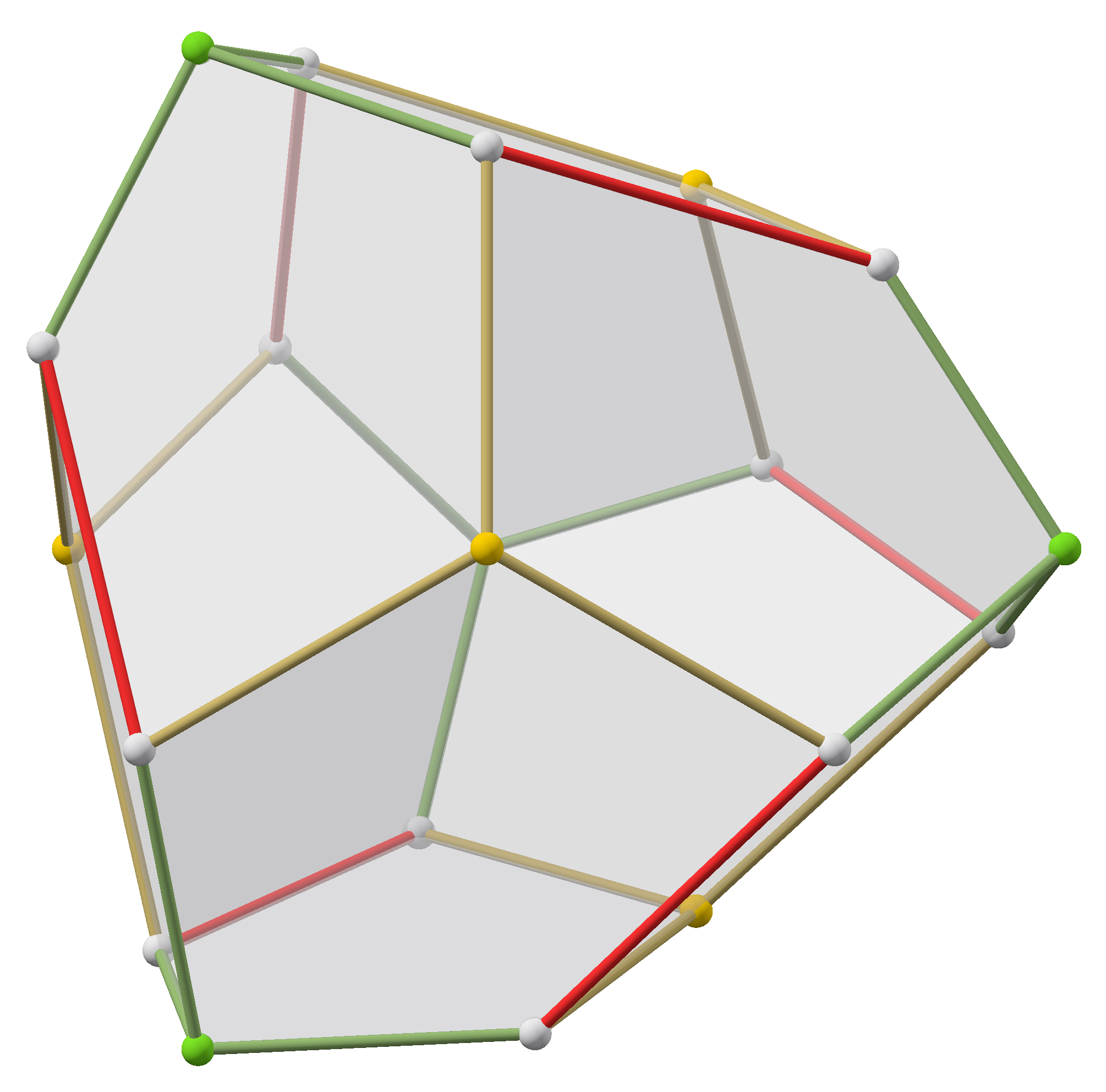
Orthographic projections from 2- and 3-fold axes

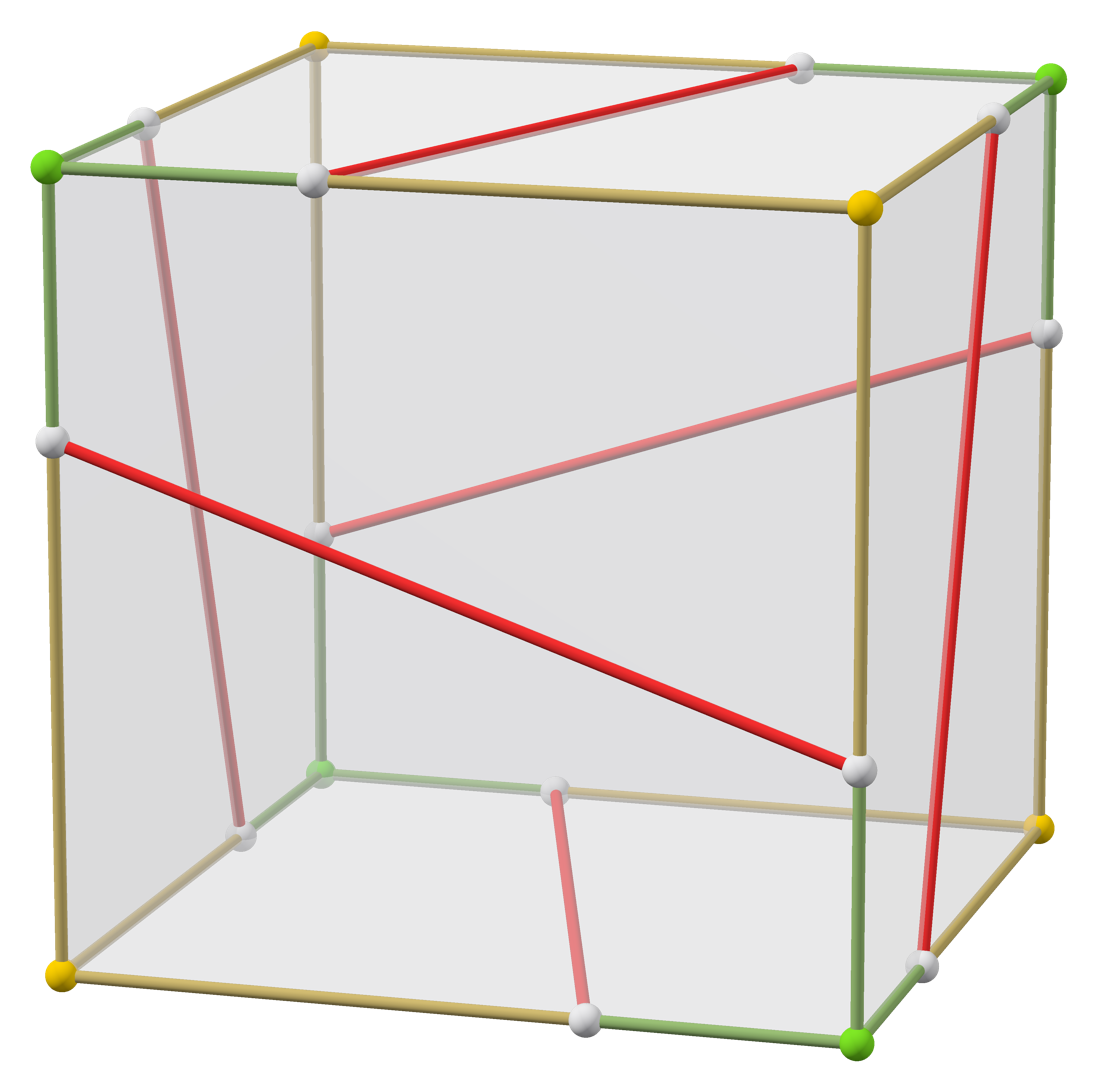
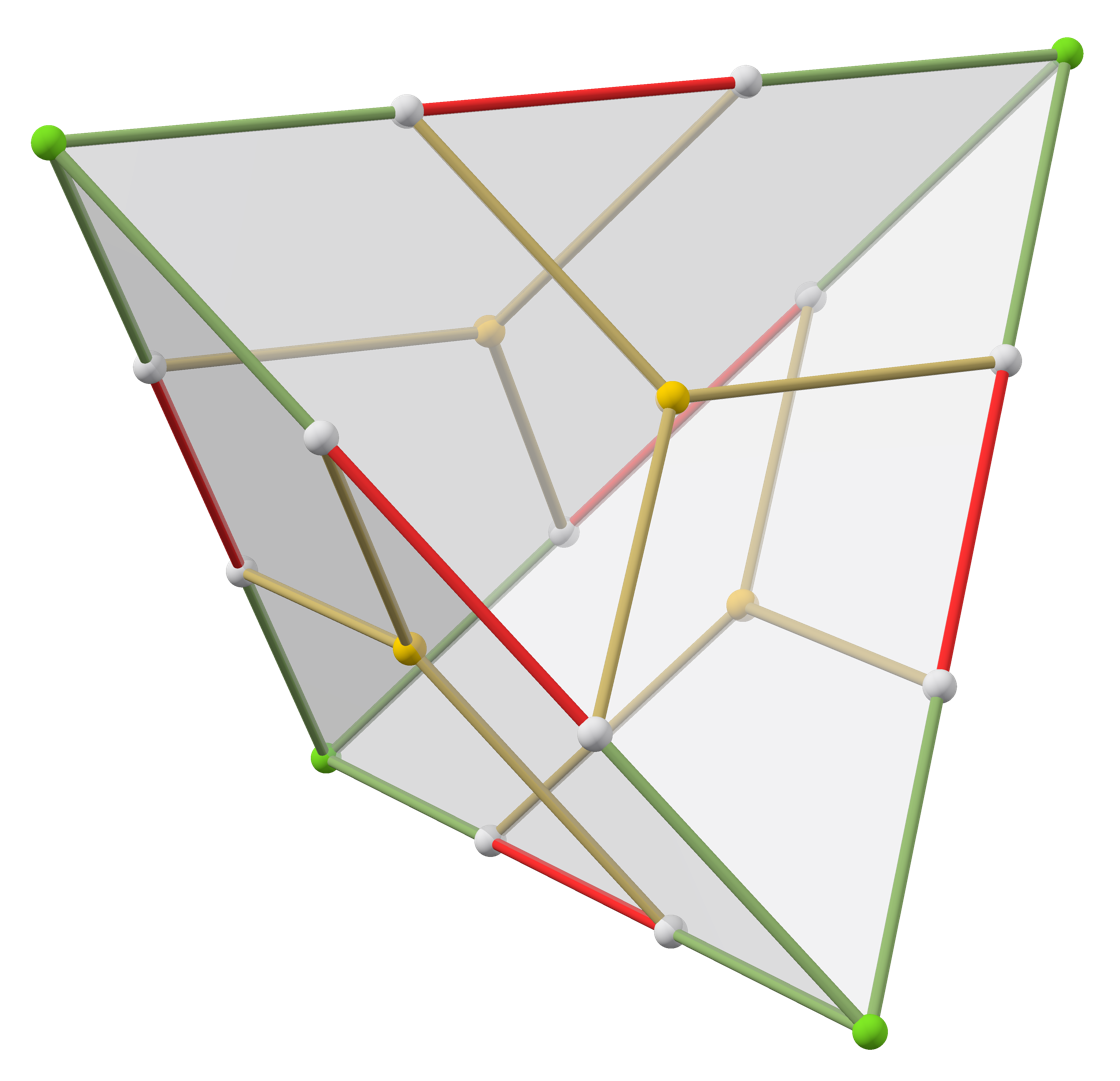
Cubic and tetrahedral form

Relationship to the dyakis dodecahedron

A tetartoid can be created by enlarging 12 of the 24 faces of a dyakis dodecahedron. (The tetartoid shown here is based on one that is itself created by enlarging 24 of the 48 faces of the disdyakis dodecahedron.)

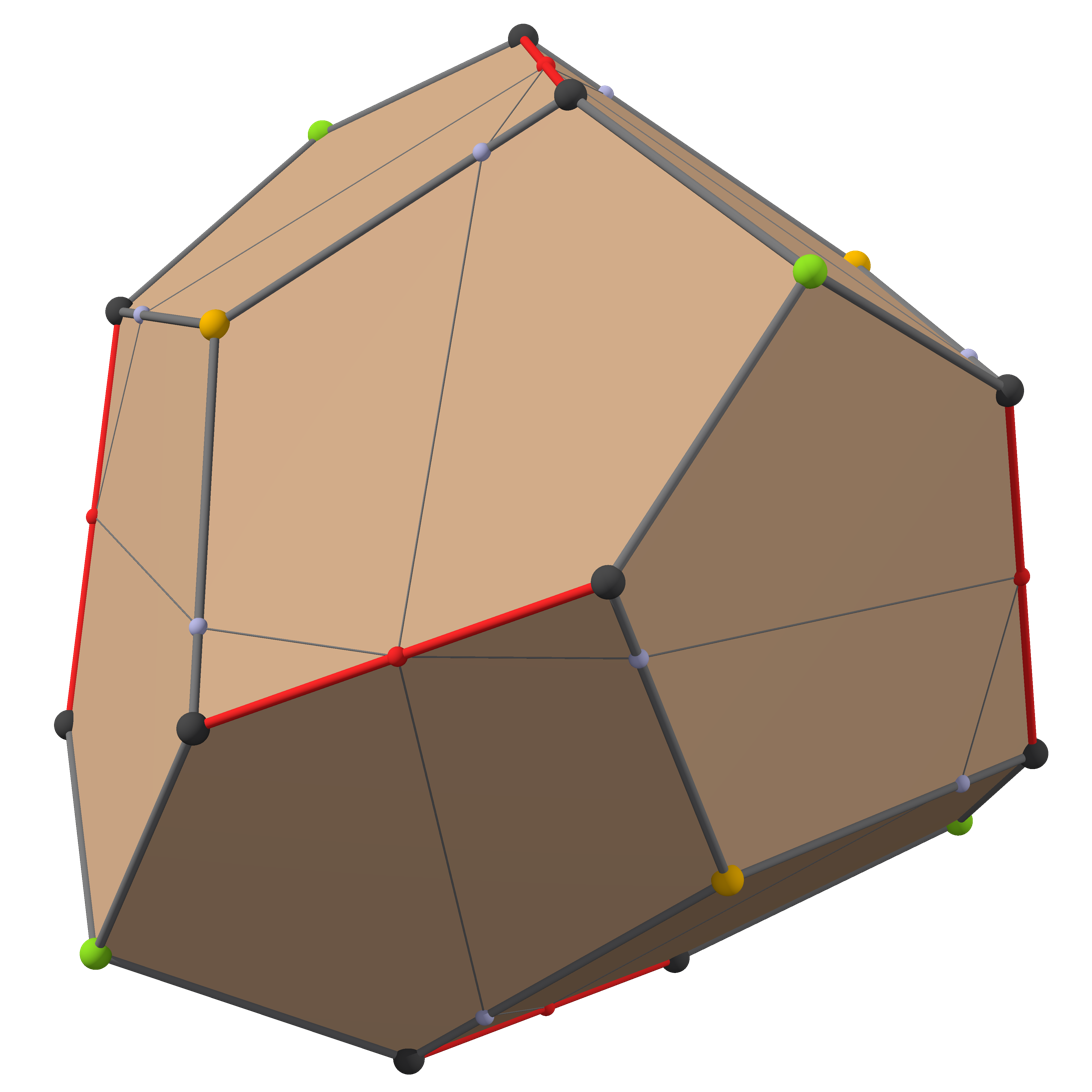
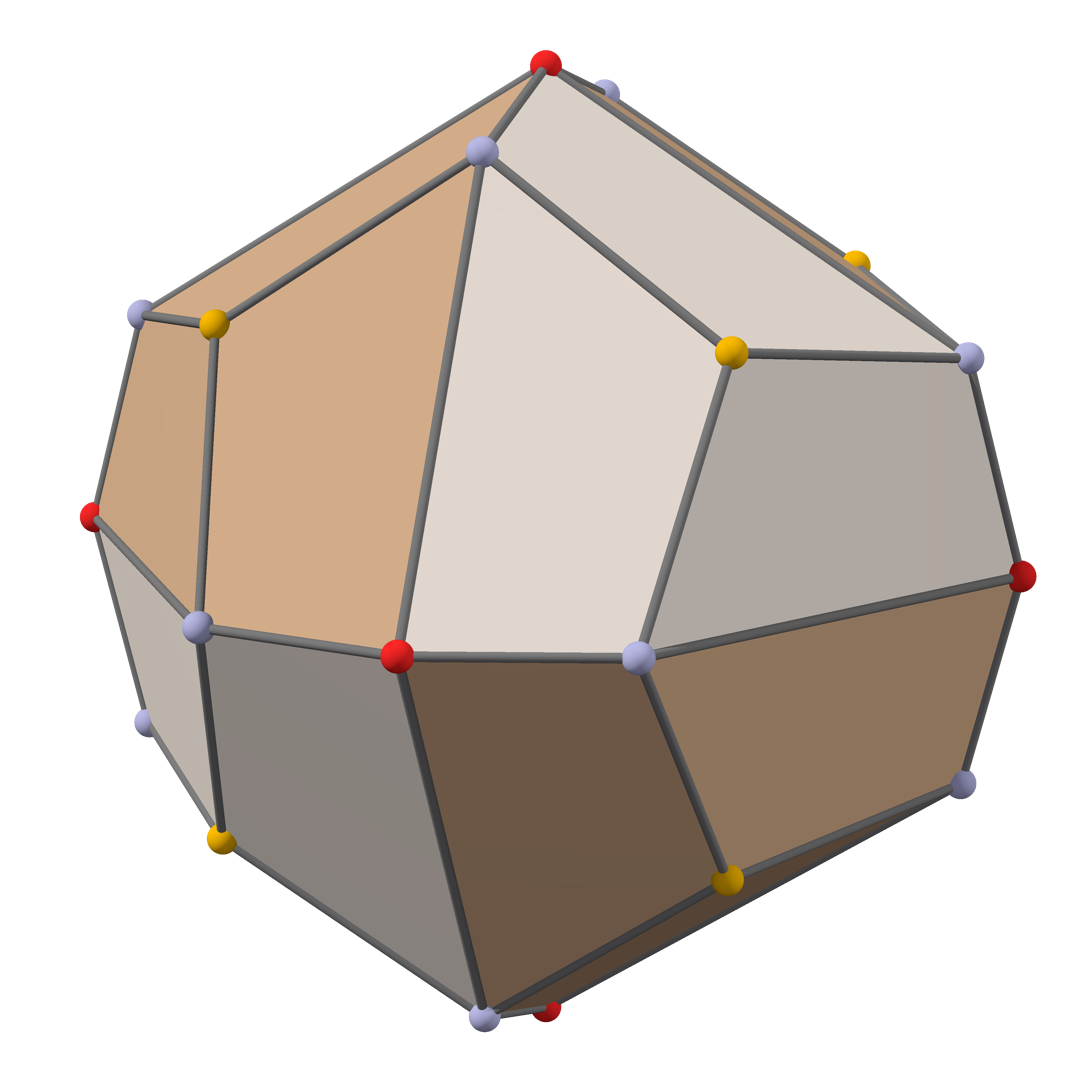
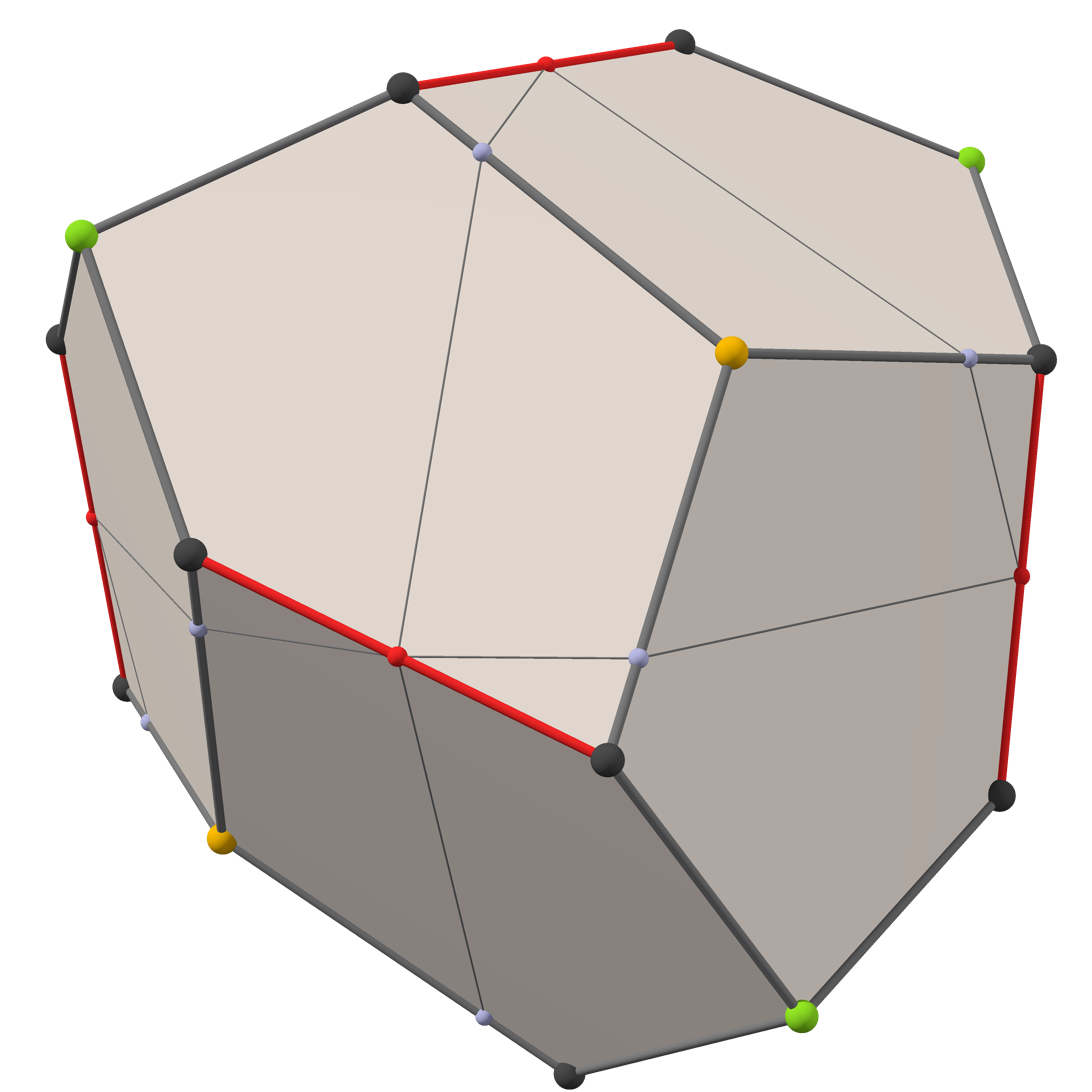
Chiral tetartoids based on the dyakis dodecahedron in the middle

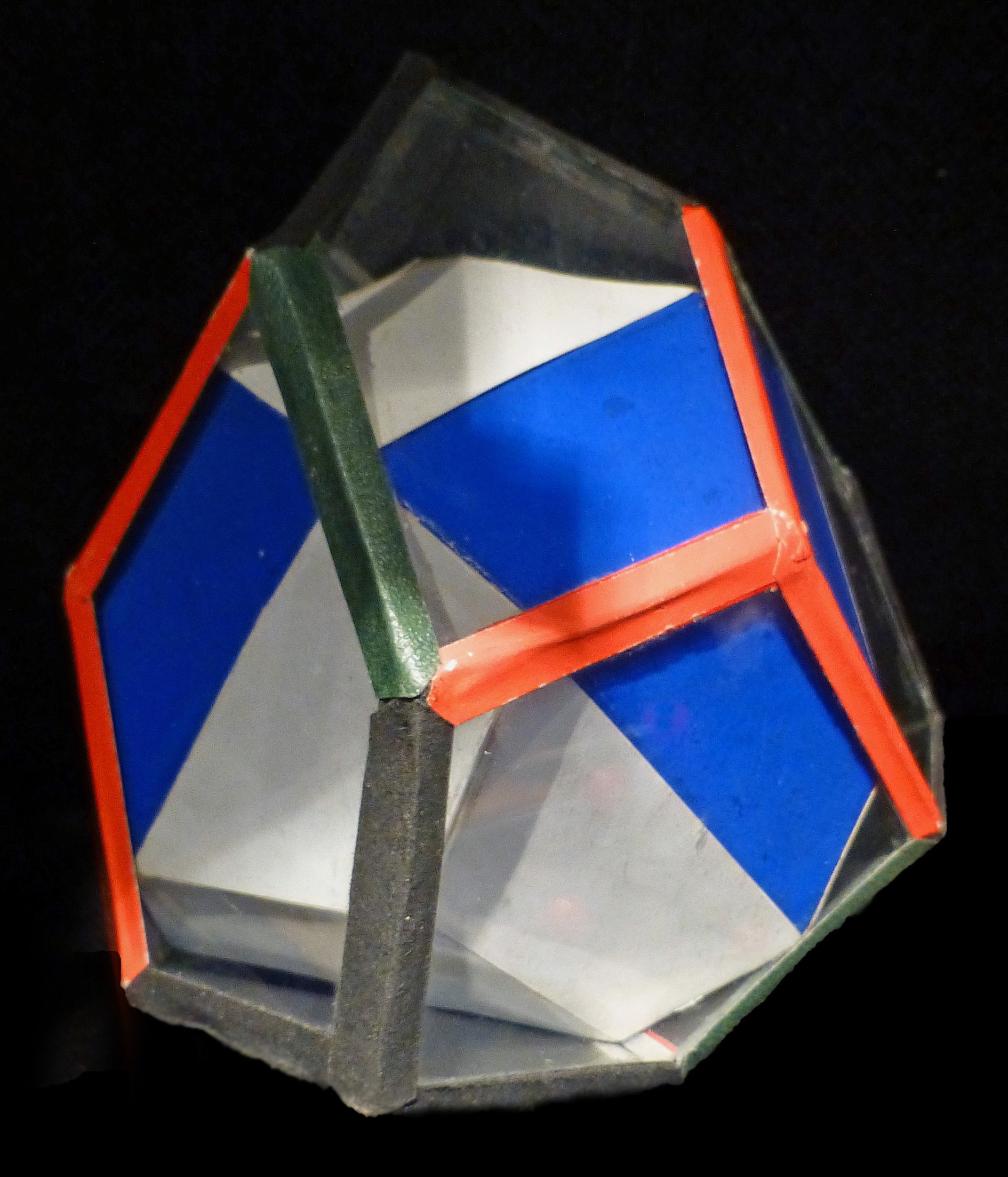
Crystal model

The crystal model on the right shows a tetartoid created by enlarging the blue faces of the dyakis dodecahedral core. Therefore, the edges between the blue faces are covered by the red skeleton edges.

==== Cartesian coordinates ====
The following points are vertices of a tetartoid pentagon under tetrahedral symmetry:

(a, b, c); (−a, −b, c); (−n/d_{1}, −n/d_{1}, n/d_{1}); (−c, −a, b); (−n/d_{2}, n/d_{2}, n/d_{2}),

under the following conditions:

0 ≤ a ≤ b ≤ c,
n = a^{2}c − bc^{2},
d_{1} = a^{2} − ab + b^{2} + ac − 2bc,
d_{2} = a^{2} + ab + b^{2} − ac − 2bc,
nd_{1}d_{2} ≠ 0.

==== Geometric freedom ====
The regular dodecahedron is a tetartoid with more than the required symmetry. The triakis tetrahedron is a degenerate case with 12 zero-length edges. (In terms of the colors used above this means, that the white vertices and green edges are absorbed by the green vertices.)

Tetartoid variations from regular dodecahedron to triakis tetrahedron

== Rhombic dodecahedron ==
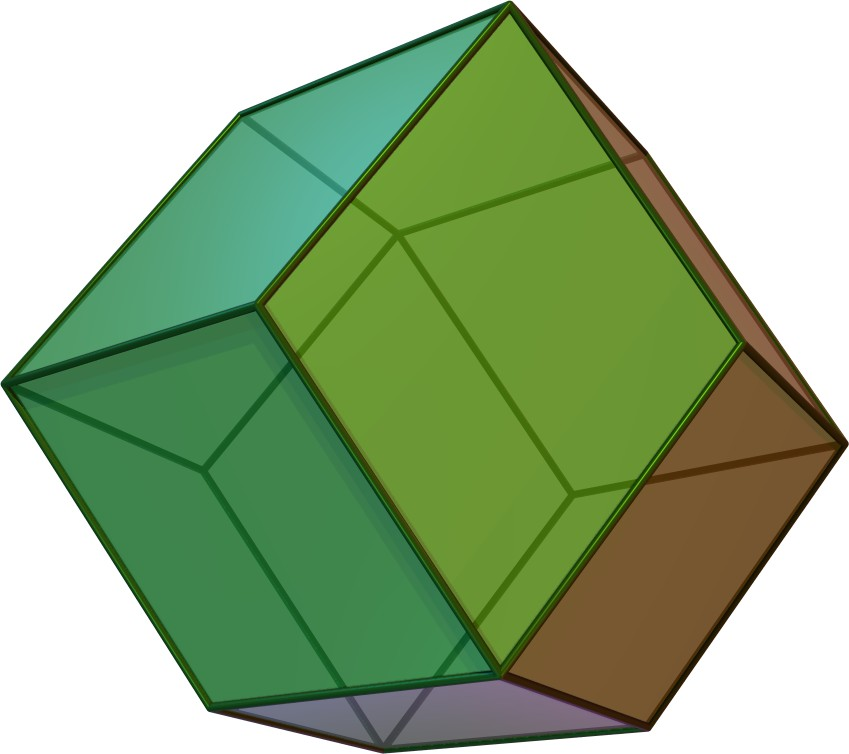
Rhombic dodecahedron

The rhombic dodecahedron is a Catalan solid with twelve rhombic faces and octahedral symmetry. It is dual to the cuboctahedron, an Archimedean solid, and occurs in nature as a crystal form. The rhombic dodecahedron packs together to fill space with centrally symmetric faces, a zonohedron.

The rhombic dodecahedron can be seen as a degenerate pyritohedron where the 6 special edges have been reduced to zero length, reducing the pentagons into rhombic faces.

The rhombic dodecahedron has several stellations, the first of which is also a parallelohedral spacefiller.

Another important rhombic dodecahedron, the Bilinski dodecahedron, has twelve faces congruent to those of the rhombic triacontahedron, i.e. the diagonals are in the ratio of the golden ratio. It is also a zonohedron and was described by Bilinski in 1960. This figure is another spacefiller, and can also occur in non-periodic spacefillings along with the rhombic triacontahedron, the rhombic icosahedron, and rhombic hexahedra.

== Other dodecahedra ==
There are 6,384,634 topologically distinct convex dodecahedra, excluding mirror images—the number of vertices ranges from 8 to 20. Two polyhedra are topologically distinct if they have intrinsically different arrangements of faces and vertices, such that it is impossible to distort one into the other simply by changing the lengths of edges or the angles between edges or faces.

Topologically, notably distinct dodecahedra (excluding pentagonal and rhombic forms) include:

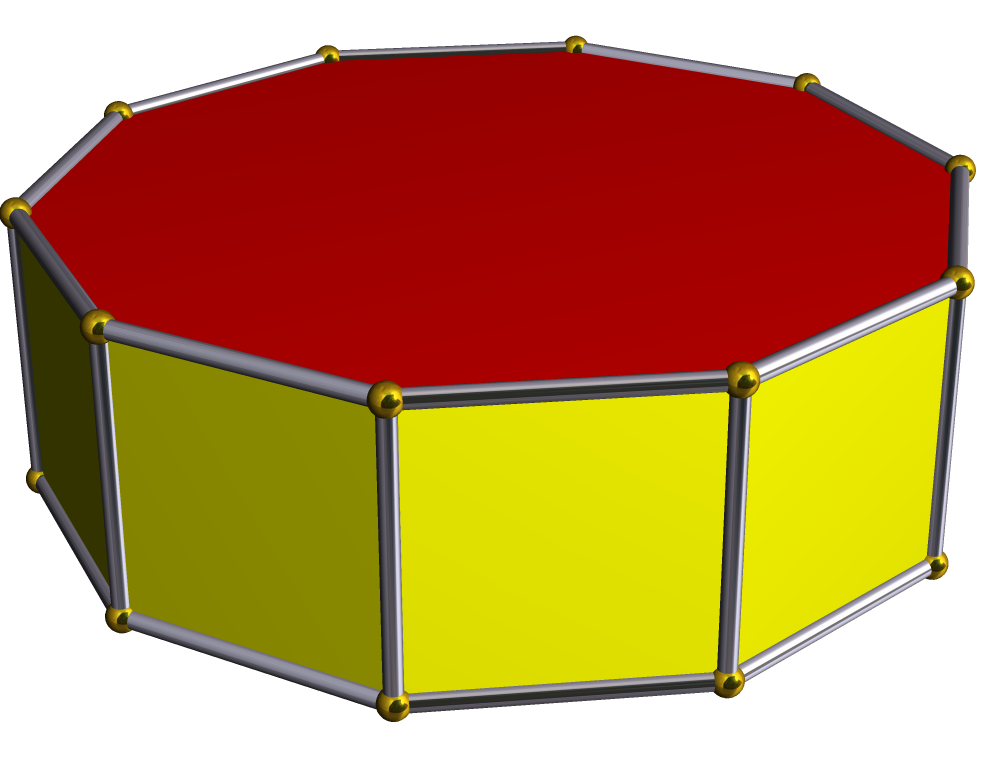
Decagonal prism, a prism consisting of ten squares and two decagonal bases. Its symmetry group is D_{10h} symmetry of order 40.

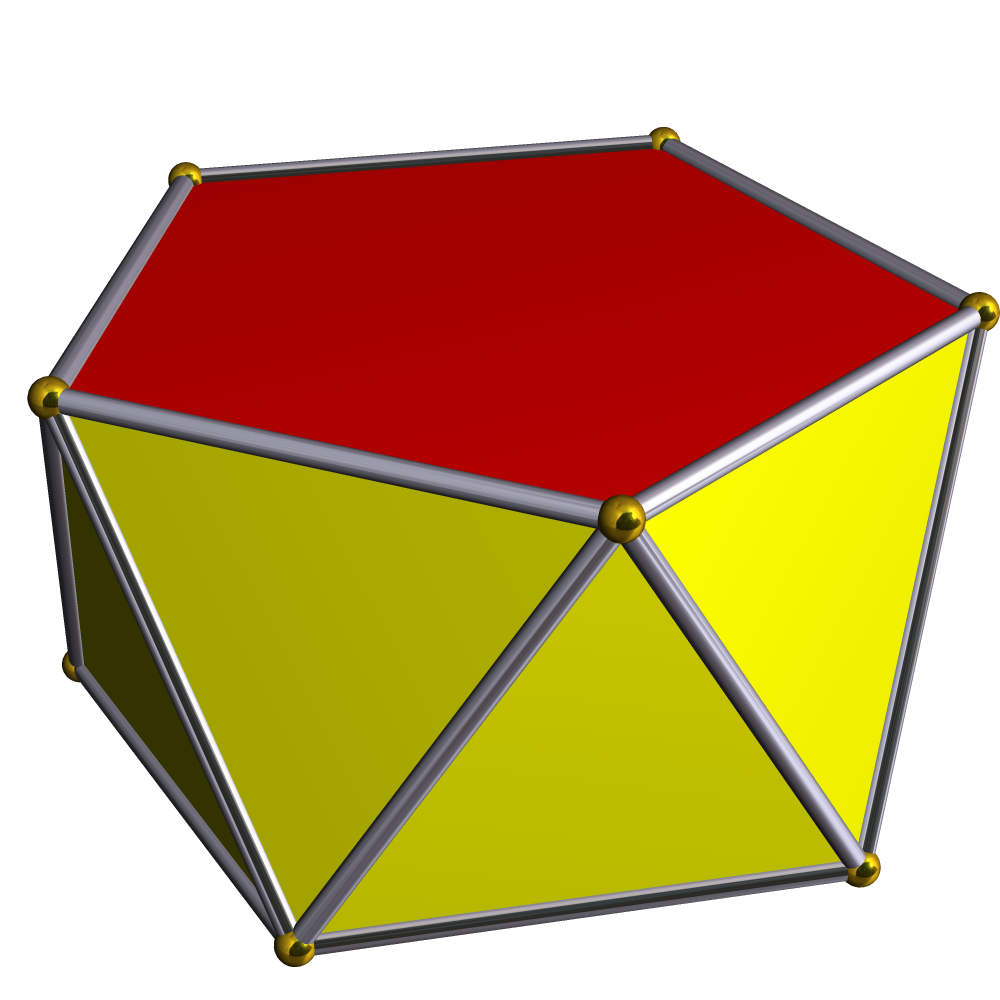
Pentagonal antiprism: an antiprism consisting of ten equilateral triangles and two pentagonal bases. It is D_{5d} symmetry of order 20.

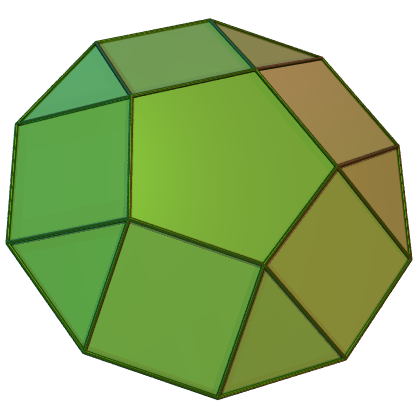
Pentagonal cupola: a Johnson solid with five triangles, five squares, one pentagon, and one decagon. It is C_{5v} symmetry of order 10.

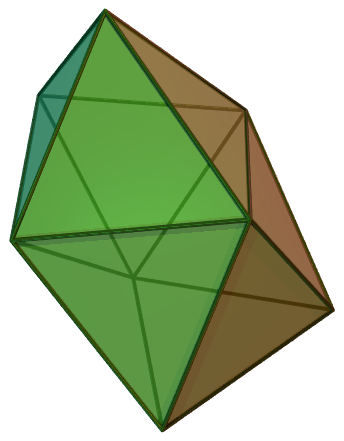
Snub disphenoid: both Johnson solid and deltahedron, consisting of twelve equilateral triangles. It is D_{2d} of order 8, the same symmetries as a tetragonal disphenoid. Its dual is elongated gyrobifastigium, an octahedron.

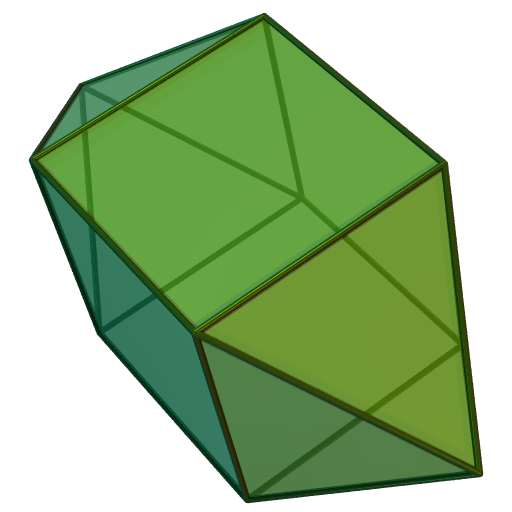
Elongated square dipyramid, a Johnson solid. Obtained by augmenting two opposite faces of a cube by equilateral square pyramids, the resulting polyhedron has eight triangles and four squares. It is D_{4h} symmetry of order 16.

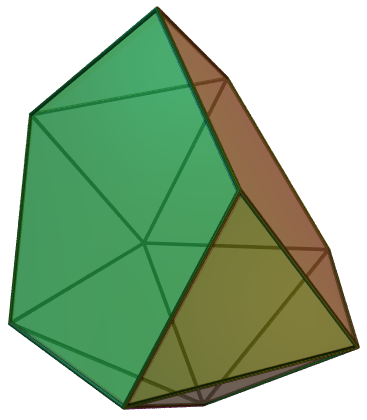
Metabidiminished icosahedron: a Johnson solid obtained by removing two pentagonal pyramids from a regular icosahedron, resulting in ten triangles and two pentagons. It is C_{2v} symmetry of order 4.

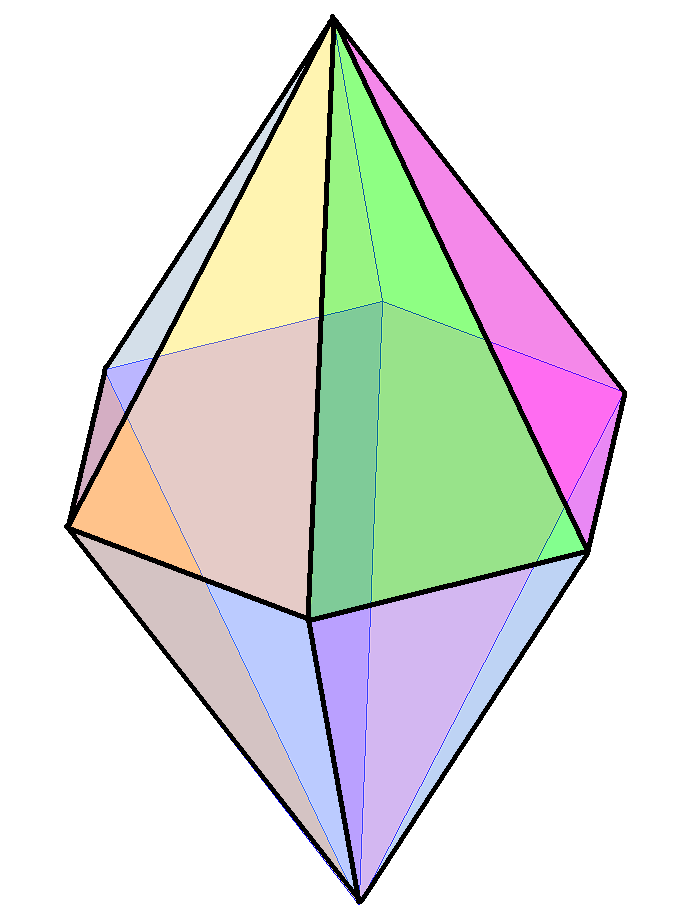
Hexagonal bipyramid: a bipyramid with twelve isosceles triangles, obtained by attaching two hexagonal pyramids base-to-base. If both affixed pyramids have regular bases and apices perpendicular to the center of their base, the bipyramid has D_{6h} symmetry of order 24. Like any other bipyramids, the hexagonal bipyramid is face-transitive and the dual of hexagonal prism.

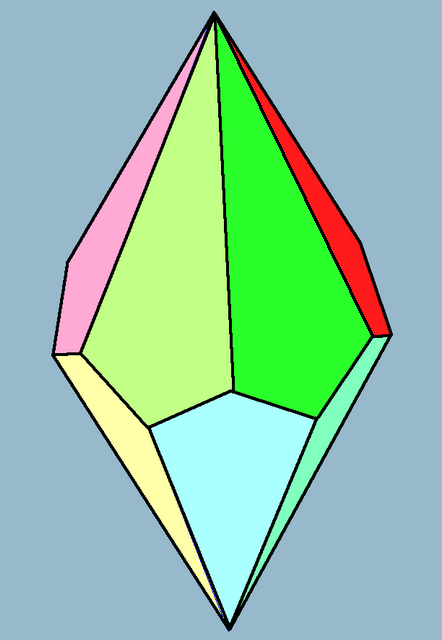
Hexagonal trapezohedron: a trapezohedron with twelve kites. It is face-transitive, the dual of hexagonal antiprism, and has D_{6d} symmetry of order 24.

Triakis tetrahedron: a Catalan solid and the Kleetope of a regular tetrahedron. Obtained by affixing four triangular pyramids onto each face of the regular tetrahedron, the resulting polyhedron has twelve isosceles triangles. It is face-transitive and Rupert property. It is the dual of truncated tetrahedron, shares the same symmetry as T_{d} symmetry of order 24.

Hendecagonal pyramid: the eleven isosceles triangles and one regular hendecagon faces in a pyramid. It has C_{11v} symmetry of order 11.

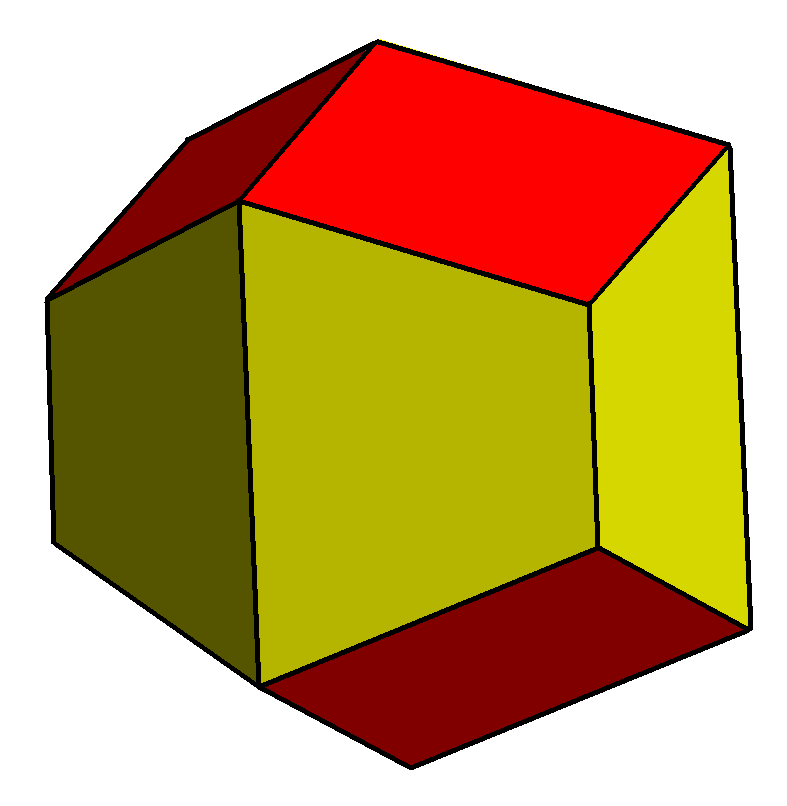
Trapezo-rhombic dodecahedron: a polyhedron with six rhombi, six trapezoids. It is the dual of triangular orthobicupola, both have D_{3h} symmetry of order 12. It is known for tessellating by translating a copy of itself.

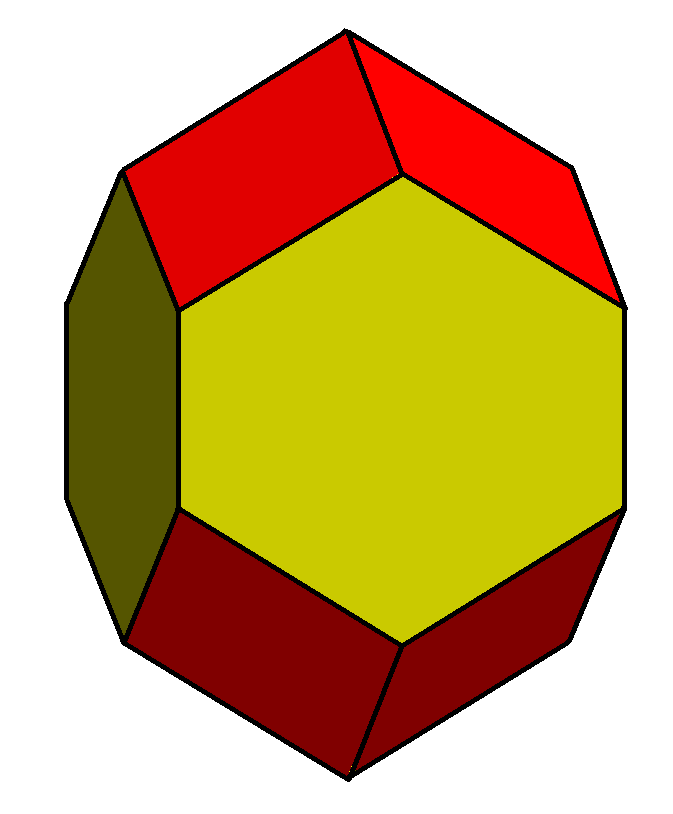
Rhombo-hexagonal dodecahedron (also known as "elongated dodecahedron"): a polyhedron with eight rhombi and four equilateral hexagons. it has D_{4h} symmetry of order 16. It is one of five Federov polyhedra or parallelohedra, generated to create its honeycomb.

== Practical usage ==
Armand Spitz used a dodecahedron as the "globe" equivalent for his Digital Dome planetarium projector, based upon a suggestion from Albert Einstein.

== Notes ==
Fundamental convex regular and uniform polytopes
Family	A_{n}	B_{n}	I_{2}(p) / D_{n}	E_{6} / E_{7} / E_{8} / F_{4} / G_{2}	H_{n}
Regular polygon	Triangle	Square	p-gon	Hexagon	Pentagon
Uniform polyhedron	Tetrahedron	Octahedron • Cube	Demicube		Dodecahedron • Icosahedron
Uniform polychoron	Pentachoron	16-cell • Tesseract	Demitesseract	24-cell	120-cell • 600-cell
Uniform 5-polytope	5-simplex	5-orthoplex • 5-cube	5-demicube		
Uniform 6-polytope	6-simplex	6-orthoplex • 6-cube	6-demicube	1_{22} • 2_{21}	
Uniform 7-polytope	7-simplex	7-orthoplex • 7-cube	7-demicube	1_{32} • 2_{31} • 3_{21}	
Uniform 8-polytope	8-simplex	8-orthoplex • 8-cube	8-demicube	1_{42} • 2_{41} • 4_{21}	
Uniform n-polytope	n-simplex	n-orthoplex • n-cube	n-demicube	1_{k2} • 2_{k1} • k_{21}	n-pentagonal polytope
Topics: Polytope families • Regular polytope • List of regular polytopes and compounds • Polytope operations
