= Gyrobifastigium =

Polyhedron formed by joining two prisms

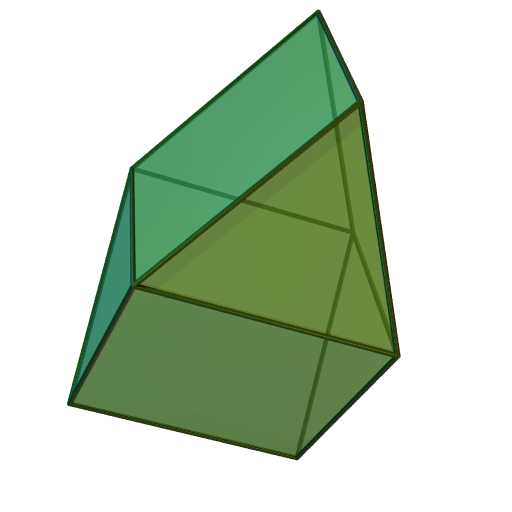
- Type: Johnson; J_{25} – J_{26} – J_{27}
- Faces: 4 triangles 4 squares
- Edges: 14
- Vertices: 8
- Vertex configuration: 4(3.4^{2}); 4(3.4.3.4)
- Symmetry group: D_{2d}
- Dual polyhedron: § Dual of a gyrobifastigium
- Properties: convex, composite, honeycomb

Net
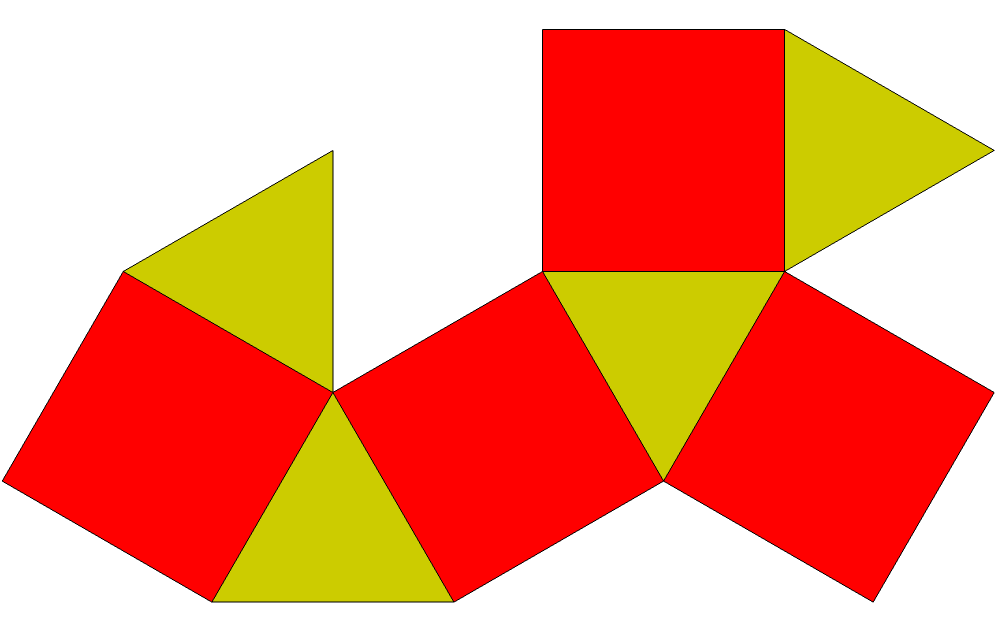

3D model of a gyrobifastigium

In geometry, the gyrobifastigium is a polyhedron that is constructed by attaching a triangular prism to the square face of another one. It is an example of a Johnson solid. It is the only Johnson solid outside of the uniform polyhedra that can tile three-dimensional space.

== Naming and construction ==
The name of the gyrobifastigium comes from the Latin fastigium, meaning a "sloping roof". In the standard naming convention of the Johnson solids, bi- means two solids connected at their bases, and gyro- means the two halves are twisted with respect to each other.

The gyrobifastigium is constructed by attaching two triangular prisms along corresponding square faces, giving a quarter-turn to one prism. These prisms cover the square faces so the resulting polyhedron has four equilateral triangles and four squares, making eight faces in total, an octahedron. Because its faces are all regular polygons and it is convex, the gyrobifastigium is a Johnson solid, named after American mathematician Norman W. Johnson who listed the 92 such polyhedra; it is indexed as twenty-sixth Johnson solid $J_{26}$. The gyrobifastigium is composite, because it can be sliced by a plane into two triangular prisms; these prisms are elementaries because they cannot be sliced into many convex, regular-faced polyhedra.

Cartesian coordinates for the gyrobifastigium with regular faces and unit edge lengths may easily be derived from the formula of the height of unit edge length $h = \frac{\sqrt{3}}{2}$ as follows:
$$\left(\pm\frac{1}{2},\pm\frac{1}{2},0\right),\left(0,\pm\frac{1}{2},\frac{\sqrt{3}}{2}\right),\left(\pm\frac{1}{2},0,-\frac{\sqrt{3}}{2}\right).$$

== Properties ==
To calculate the formula for the surface area and volume of a gyrobifastigium with regular faces and with edge length $a$, one may adapt the corresponding formulae for the triangular prism. Its surface area $A$ can be obtained by summing the area of four equilateral triangles and four squares. The area of an equilateral triangle and a square of side $a$ are $\frac{\sqrt{3}}{4}a^2$ and $a^2$, respectively. Therefore,
$$A = 4\left(\frac{\sqrt{3}}{4}a^2\right) + 4a^2 = \left(4+\sqrt{3}\right)a^2 \approx 5.73205a^2.$$
Its volume $V$ is twice the triangular prism's volume. The formula of a uniform triangular prism with edge length $a$ is $\frac{\sqrt{3}}{4}a^3$. That is:
$$V = 2 \left(\frac{\sqrt{3}}{4}a^3\right) = \frac{\sqrt{3}}{2}a^3 \approx 0.86603a^3.$$

A gyrobifastigium has a three-dimensional symmetry group, the antiprismatic symmetry $D_{2\mathrm{d}}$ of order eight. It has three kinds of edge, each with a different dihedral angle:

- between two squares of either prism, the interior angle of an equilateral triangle $\frac{\pi}{3} = 60^\circ$;
- between a triangle and a square of the same prism, $\frac{\pi}{2} = 90^\circ$;
- between a triangle and a square of the other prism, across the plane joining the two prisms, $\frac{\pi}{2} + \frac{\pi}{3} = \frac{5 \pi}{6} = 150^\circ$.

== Related figures ==
The Schmitt–Conway–Danzer biprism

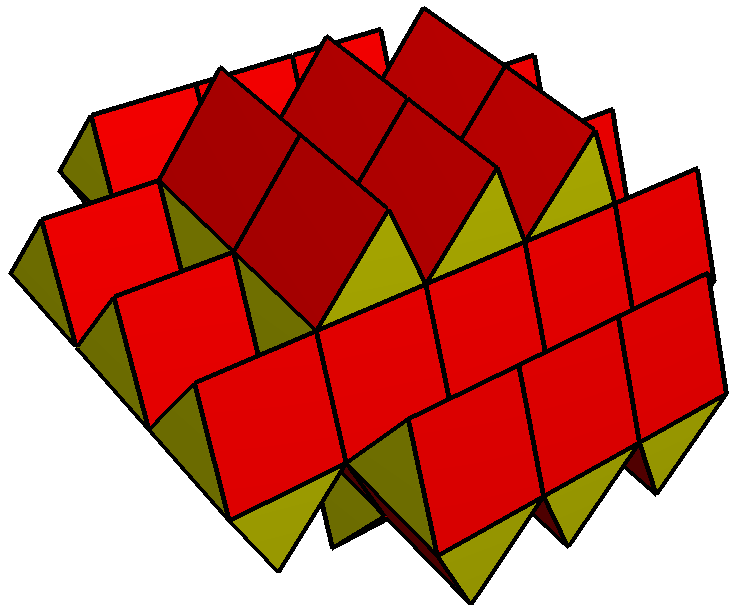
The gyrobifastigium honeycomb

The Schmitt–Conway–Danzer biprism, also called an SCD prototile, is a polyhedron combinatorially equivalent to the gyrobifastigium, but with parallelogram and irregular triangle faces instead of squares and equilateral triangles. Like the gyrobifastigium, it can fill space, but only aperiodically or with a screw symmetry, not with a full three-dimensional group of symmetries. Thus, it provides a partial solution to the three-dimensional einstein problem.

The gyrated triangular prismatic honeycomb can be constructed by packing together large numbers of identical gyrobifastigiums. The gyrobifastigium is one of five convex polyhedra with regular faces capable of space-filling (the others being the cube, truncated octahedron, triangular prism, and hexagonal prism) and it is the only Johnson solid capable of doing so.

The dual of a gyrobifastigium is combinatorially equivalent to the subdivided cube

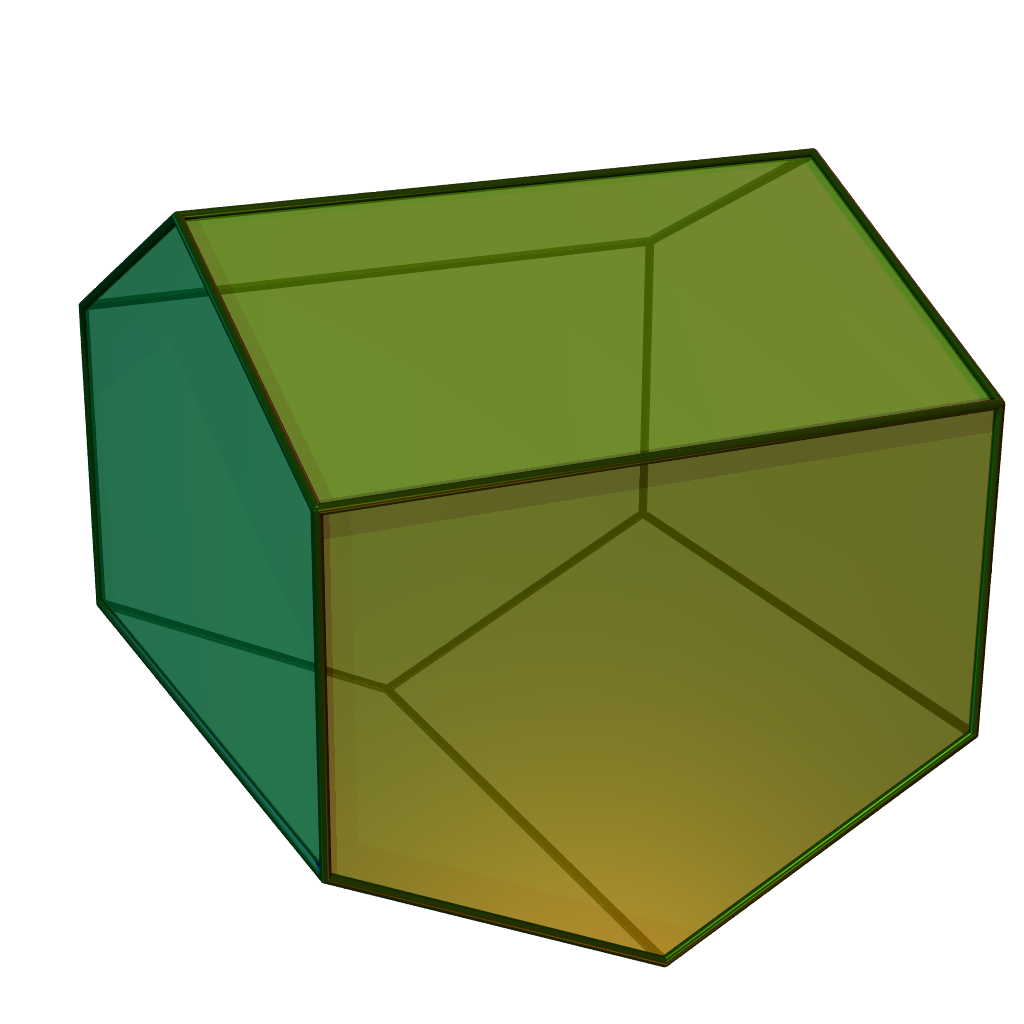
Subdivided cube combinatorially equivalent to the elongated gyrobifastigium

The vertices of a gyrobifastigium's dual polyhedron can be constructed in the Cartesian plane with the coordinates
$$\begin{align}
\quad (0,0,0), \quad (0,0,1), \quad (1,0,0), \quad (1,0,1), \\
\left(\tfrac{1}{2}, \pm \tfrac{1}{2}, \tfrac{\sqrt{2}}{2}\right), \quad \left(\tfrac{1}{2}, \pm \tfrac{1}{2}, \tfrac{\sqrt{2}}{2} + 1\right).
\end{align}$$
By these coordinates, the dual of a gyrobifastigium has four triangles and four quadrilaterals as its faces. It is combinatorially equivalent to a cube with two of its opposite faces subdivided into triangles by diagonals that are not parallel to each other.

A combinatorially equivalent form of the elongated gyrobifastigium, a related space-filling polyhedron, can be obtained by instead subdividing two opposite faces of a cube into rectangles by midlines, again choosing the subdivision lines to be non-parallel.
