= Elongated gyrobifastigium =

Space-filling polyhedron with 8 faces

Elongated gyrobifastigium Gabled rhombohedron
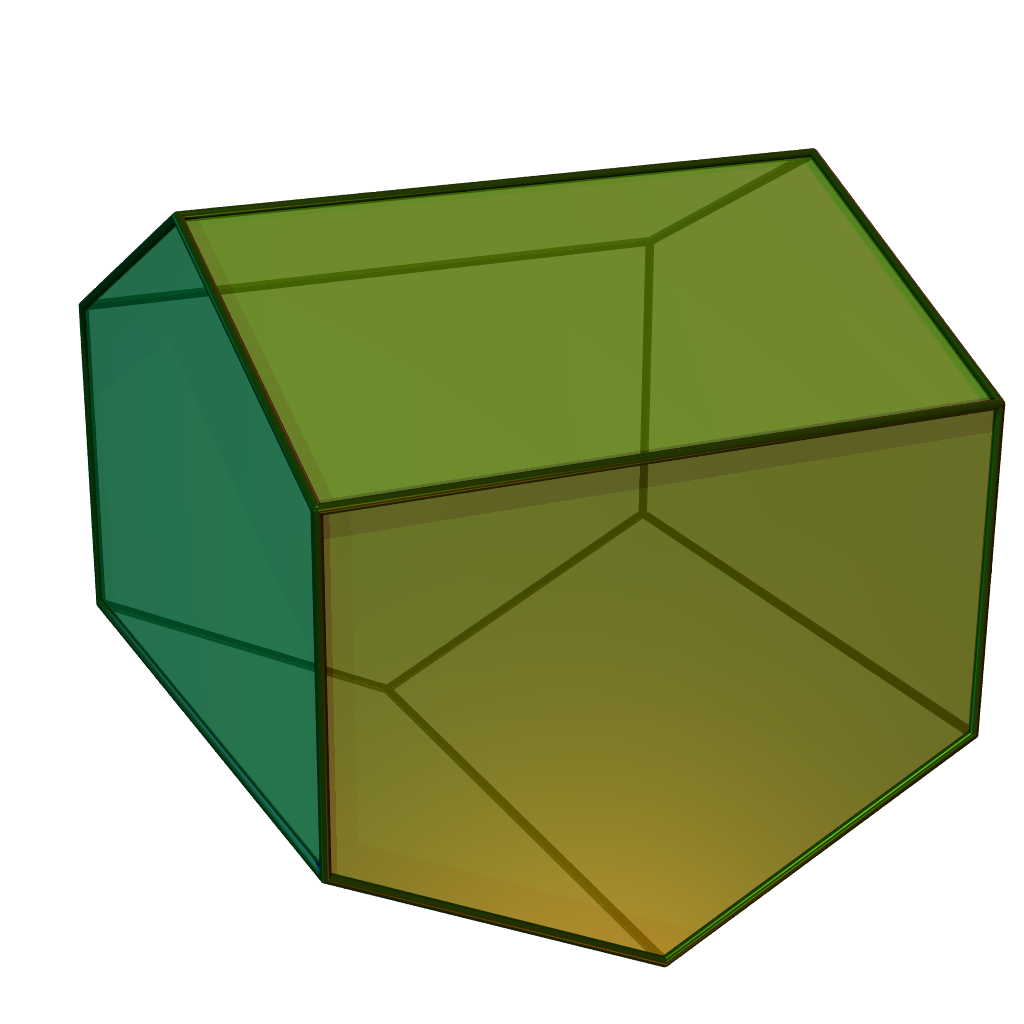
- Type: Stereohedron
- Faces: 4 rectangles 4 irregular pentagons
- Edges: 18
- Vertices: 12
- Vertex configuration: (4) 4.4.5 (8) 4.5.5
- Symmetry group: D_{2d}, [2^{+},4], (2*2), order 8
- Rotation group: D_{2}, [2,2]^{+}, (222), order 4
- Dual polyhedron: Snub disphenoid
- Properties: convex, space-filling

Net
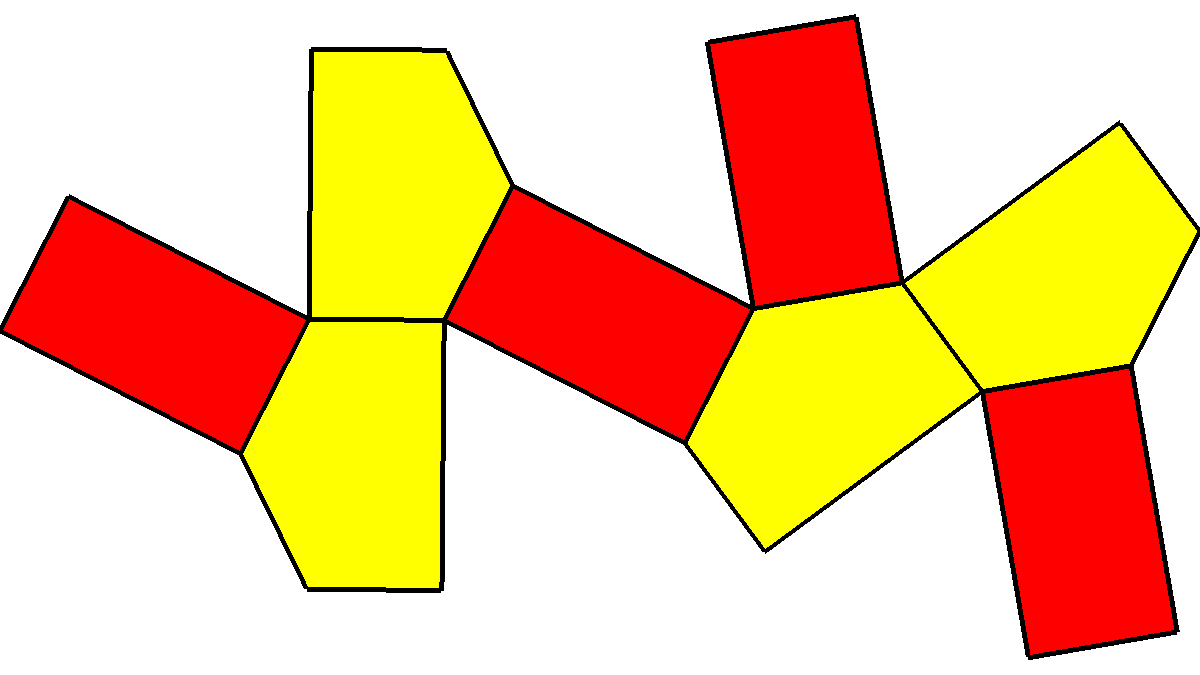

In geometry, the elongated gyrobifastigium or gabled rhombohedron is a space-filling octahedron with 4 rectangles and 4 right-angled pentagonal faces.

== Name ==
The first name is from the regular-faced gyrobifastigium but elongated with 4 triangles expanded into pentagons. The name of the gyrobifastigium comes from the Latin fastigium, meaning a sloping roof. In the standard naming convention of the Johnson solids, bi- means two solids connected at their bases, and gyro- means the two halves are twisted with respect to each other. The gyrobifastigium is first in a series of gyrobicupola, so this solid can also be called an elongated digonal gyrobicupola. Geometrically, it can also be constructed as the dual of a digonal gyrobianticupola. This construction is space-filling.

The second name, gabled rhombohedron, is from Michael Goldberg's paper on space-filling octahedra, model 8-VI, the 6th of at least 49 space-filling octahedra. A gable is the triangular portion of a wall between the edges of intersecting roof pitches.

== Geometry ==
The elongated gyrobifastigium is the dual polyhedron of a snub disphenoid, one of 92 Johnson solids, sharing the same three-dimensional dihedral symmetry as antiprismatic $\mathrm{D}_{2\mathrm{d}}$ of order 8. If the underlying rectangular cuboid is distorted into a rhombohedron, the symmetry is reduced to two-fold rotational symmetry, C_{2}, order 2.

=== Related figures ===
The elongated gyrobifastigium is the cell of the isochoric tridecachoron, a polychoron constructed from the dual of the 13-5 step prism, which has a snub disphenoid vertex figure.

== Variations ==
A topologically distinct elongated gyrobifastigium has square and equilateral triangle faces, seen as 2 triangular prisms augmented to a central cube. This is a failed Johnson solid for not being strictly convex.

This is also a space-filling polyhedron, and matches the geometry of the gyroelongated triangular prismatic honeycomb if the elongated gyrobifastigium is dissected back into cubes and triangular prisms.

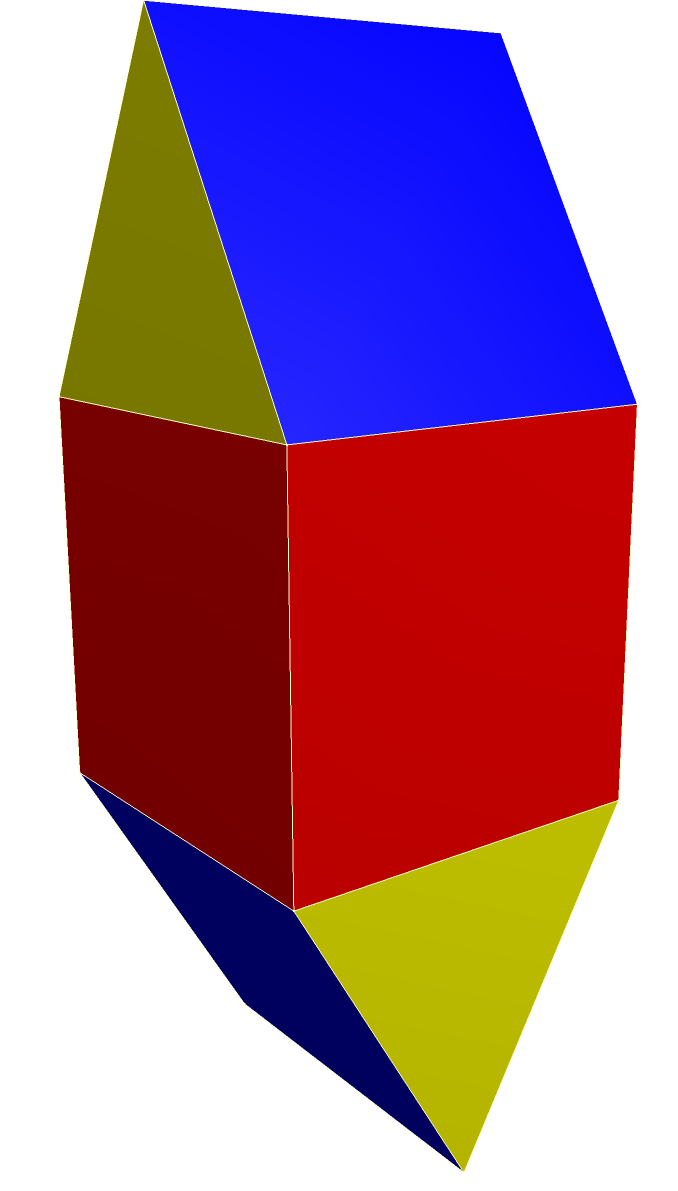
Coplanar square and triangles

The elongated gyrobifastigium must be based on a rectangular cuboid or rhombohedron to fill-space, while the angle of the roof is free, including allowing concave forms. If the roof has zero angle, the geometry becomes a cube or rectangular cuboid.

The pentagons can also be made regular and the rectangles become trapezoids, and it will no longer be space-filling.

Type	Space-filling				Not space-filling	
Image	Equilateral pentagons	Rhombic	Coplanar	Concave	Dual of snub disphenoid	Regular pentagons
Net						

== Honeycomb ==
Like the gyrobifastigium, it can self-tessellate space. Polyhedra are tessellated by translation in the plane, and are stacked with alternate orientations. The cross-section of the polyhedron must be square or rhombic, while the roof angle is free, and can be negative, making a concave polyhedron. Rhombic forms require chiral (mirror image) polyhedral pairs to be space-filling.

Equilateral variation	Rhombic variation	Convex variation	Coplanar-faced variation	Concave variation

== See also ==
- Bidiakis cube, a cubic regular graph with twelve vertices and eighteen edges.
- Elongated dodecahedron, another space-filling polyhedron
- Elongated square bipyramid, a space-filling Johnson solid
- Trapezo-rhombic dodecahedron, a space-filling dual of triangular orthobicupola
