= Triangular orthobicupola =

Two joined triangular cupolae

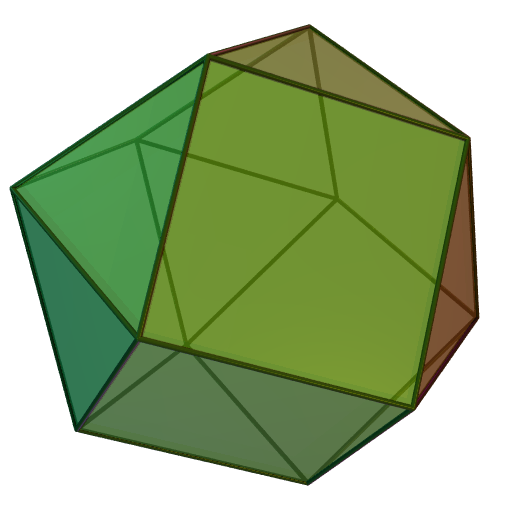
- Type: Johnson; J_{26} – J_{27} – J_{28}
- Faces: 8 triangles 6 squares
- Edges: 24
- Vertices: 12
- Vertex configuration: 6(3^{2}.4^{2}); 6(3.4.3.4)
- Symmetry group: D_{3h}
- Dihedral angle (degrees): triangle-to-triangle:141.1° triangle-to-square:125.3° square-to-square:109.5°
- Dual polyhedron: trapezo-rhombic dodecahedron
- Properties: convex, composite

Net

In geometry, the triangular orthobicupola is a polyhedron constructed by attaching two triangular cupolae along their bases. Its construction is similar to a cuboctahedron, yet the contrast is that one of its cupolae is twisted by rotating it 60°. It has an equal number of squares and triangles at each vertex, but not vertex-transitive because their vertex configurations differ. It is foundable in the coordination structure of crystals with hexagonal closed-packed spheres. Its dual polyhedron is the trapezo-rhombic dodecahedron.

== Relation to the cuboctahedron ==
=== Construction and nomenclature ===
3D model of a triangular orthobicupola

The triangular orthobicupola is constructed by attaching two regular-faced triangular cupolae at their bases, similar to the construction of a cuboctahedron. A type of face of each cupola corresponds to the another one of another: each square of the first cupola attach to a square of another, and so does the equilateral triangle. The triangular orthobicupola is a convex polyhedron with regular polygonal faces (eight equilateral triangles and six squares) and is therefore a Johnson solid, named after American mathematician Norman W. Johnson, who enumerated the 92 such polyhedra (excluding the uniform polyhedra). It is enumerated as the twenty-seventh Johnson solid, $J_{27}$.

The triangular orthobicupola a composite polyhedron. That being said, a composite polyhedron can be sliced by a plane into smaller convex, regular-faced polyhedra. Repeating the process until they cannot produce any smaller convex, regular-faced polyhedra. For the triangular orthobicupola, it can be sliced into two triangular cupolae, and these cupolae cannot do the similar process again, which is called the elementary polyhedra.

Both triangular orthobicupola and cuboctahedron share the same number of vertices, edges, and type of faces. There are twenty-four vertices, twelve edges, and fourteen faces in total, including eight equilateral triangles and six squares. A triangular orthobicupola is a cuboctahedron but twisting one of its cupolae by rotating it 60°, so that its triangular bases have the same orientation; hence, the prefix "ortho-". Several alternative names of the triangular orthobicupola are the anticuboctahedron, twisted cuboctahedron, twinned cuboctahedron, and disheptahedron.

=== Measurement ===
Since both triangular orthobicupola and cuboctahedron have the same number of faces and their type, they share the same surface area $A$. For the surface area, they are the sum of all of its polygonal faces: six squares and eight equilateral triangles. For edge length $a$, the areas of these of polygons are given by $a^2$ and $\frac{\sqrt{3}}{4}a^2$, respectively. Therefore,
$$A = 6(a^2) + 8\left(\frac{\sqrt{3}}{4}a^2\right) = \left(6 + 2\sqrt{3}\right)a^2 \approx 9.464a^2.$$

Since their components are also made from two triangular cupolae, the volume $V$, for any edge length $a$ is twice the volume of a triangular cupola:
$$V = \frac{5\sqrt{2}}{6}a^3 + \frac{5\sqrt{2}}{6}a^3 = \frac{5\sqrt{2}}{3}a^3 \approx 2.357a^3.$$

Both have the same three different dihedral angles (angles between two polygonal faces):

- An angle between two adjacent triangles is around 141°. This is obtained by adding the two triangular cupolae's triangle-to-hexagon angles.
- An angle between two adjacent squares is around 109.4°. This is obtained by adding the two triangular cupolae's square-to-hexagon angles.
- A square-to-triangle angle is the same angle as in the triangular cupola, around 125.3°.

=== Sphere packing ===
The twelve vertices of a triangular orthobicupola and a cuboctahedron represent the densely arrangement of congruent spheres packing. Each have a different type of the dense sphere packing: the triangular orthobicupola is a hexagonal closest packing (HCP) and the cuboctahedron is a cubic closest packing (CCP); They are commonly considered as ligancy in crystal coordination. For the sphere packing of a triangular orthobicupola, it resembles the structure of some chemical elements such as magnesium and helium.

== Dual polyhedron ==
The dual of a triangular orthobicupola

The dual polyhedron of a triangular orthobicupola is the trapezo-rhombic dodecahedron or trapezoidal dodecahedron, a twelve-faced solid whose faces are six rhombi and six trapezoids. It is obtained by cutting a rhombic dodecahedron in half through the hexagonal cross-section and rotating the halves 60° with respect to each other. It is a plesiohedron, a special kind of polyhedron that can tile a space with its copy, defined as the Voronoi cell of a symmetric Delone set, generated by the hexagonal close-packing.

== Symmetry ==
A triangular orthobicupola has the same symmetry as a triangular prism, the dihedral group $\mathrm{D}_{3\mathrm{h}}$ of order six.
