= Trapezo-rhombic dodecahedron =

Polyhedron with 6 rhombic and 6 trapezoidal faces

- Type: Plesiohedron
- Faces: 6 rhombi 6 trapezoids
- Edges: 24
- Vertices: 14
- Vertex configuration: (2) 4.4.4 (6) 4.4.4.4 (6) 4.4.4
- Symmetry group: D_{3h}, [3,2], (*322), order 12
- Rotation group: D_{3}, [3,2]^{+}, (322), order 6
- Dual polyhedron: Triangular orthobicupola
- Properties: convex

Net
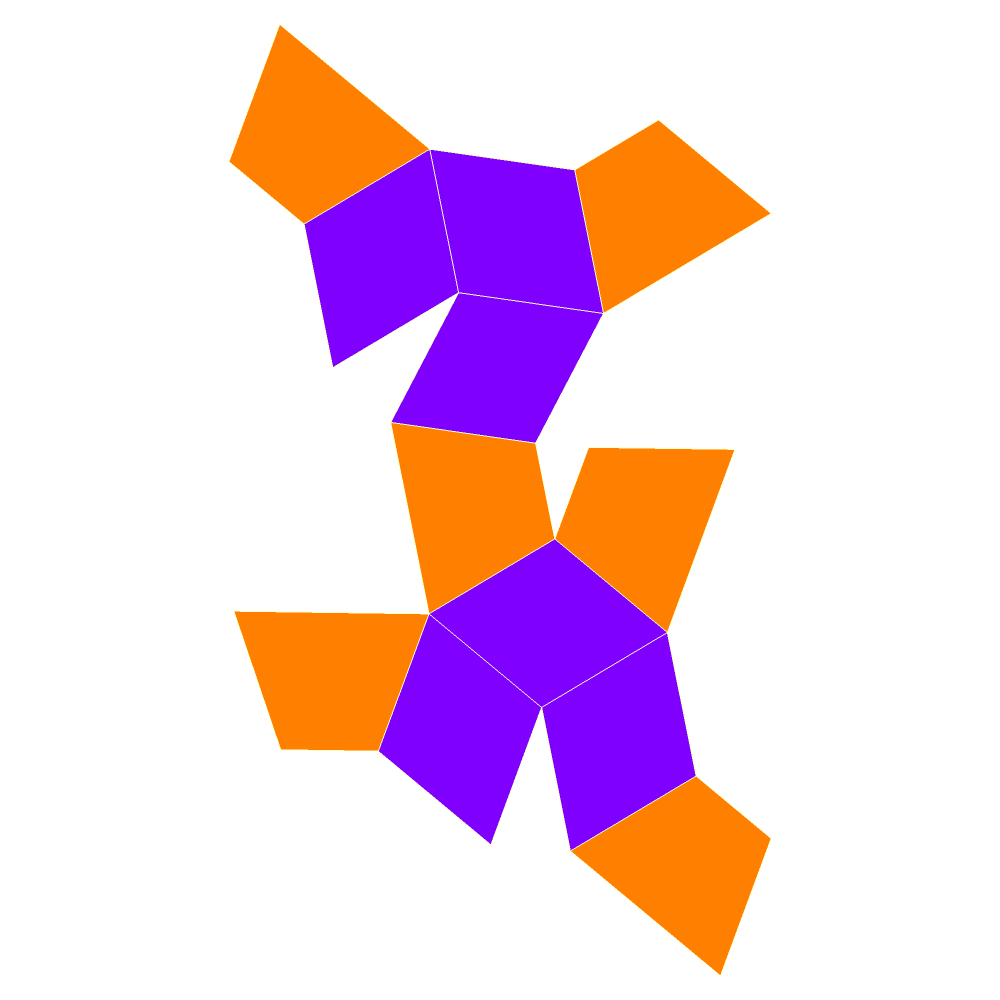

3D model of a trapezo-rhombic dodecahedron

In geometry, the trapezo-rhombic dodecahedron or rhombo-trapezoidal dodecahedron is a convex dodecahedron with 6 rhombic and 6 trapezoidal faces. It has D_{3h} symmetry. A concave form can be constructed with an identical net, seen as excavating trigonal trapezohedra from the top and bottom. It is also called the trapezoidal dodecahedron.

== Description ==
The trapezo-rhombic dodecahedron is a polyhedron with six trapezoidal and six rhombic faces. This polyhedron can be obtained from a rhombic dodecahedron by cutting it in half through the hexagonal cross-section and rotating the halves 60° with respect to each other. It is the dual polyhedron of a triangular orthobicupola, a Johnson solid whose faces are squares and equilateral triangles.

The trapezo-rhombic dodecahedron is a plesiohedron, a special kind of polyhedron that can tile a space with its copy, representing the three-dimensional Voronoi cell of a sphere in a hexagonal close packing; this and the face-centered cubic packing are the densest ways to pack spheres. It is therefore related to the rhombic dodecahedron, as suggested from the construction, which is a Voronoi cell of the other optimal way to pack spheres. The two shapes differ in their combinatorial structure as well as in their geometry: in the rhombic dodecahedron, every edge connects a degree-three vertex to a degree-four vertex, whereas the trapezo-rhombic dodecahedron has six edges that connect vertices of equal degrees.

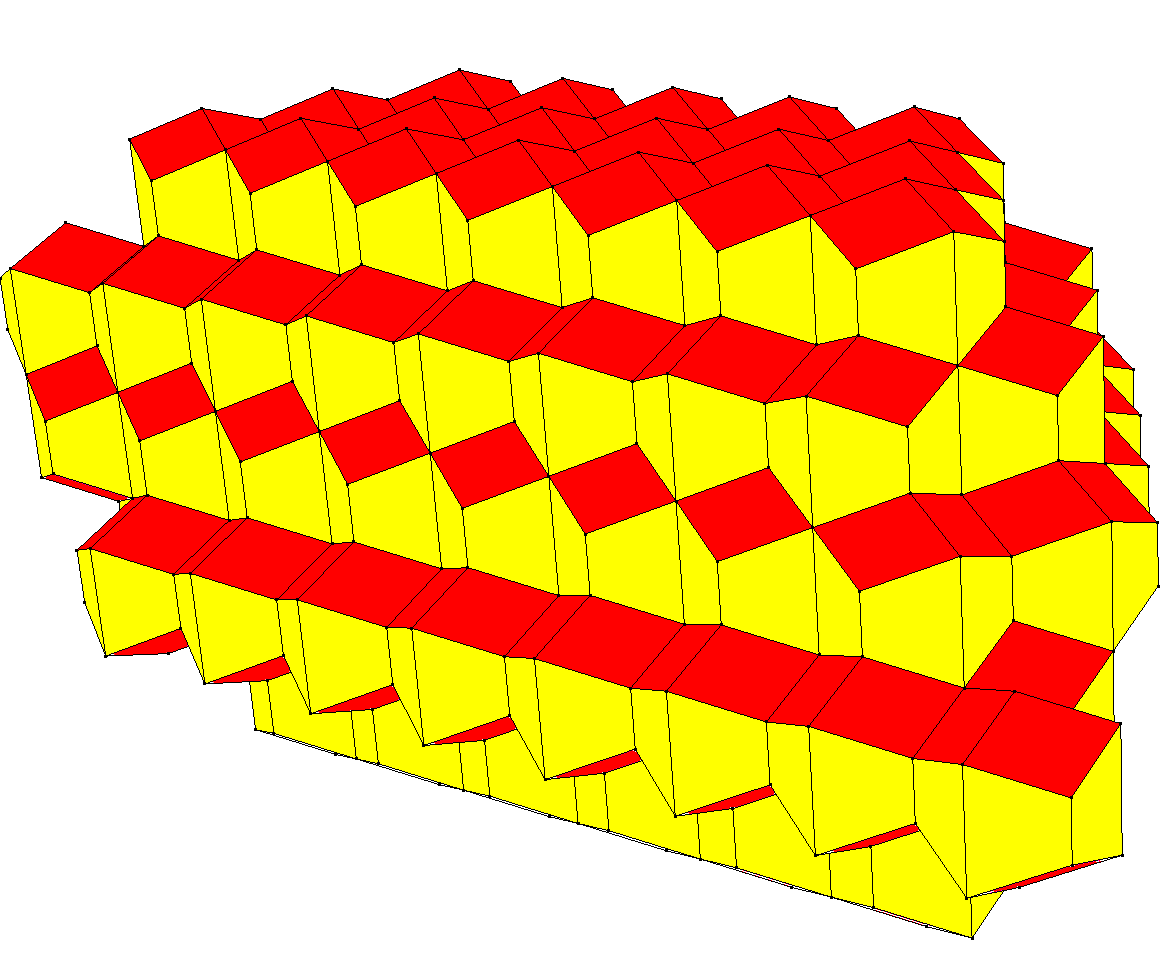
Copies of trapezo-rhombic dodecahedra as plesiohedra, creating a honeycomb

A trapezo-rhombic dodecahedron has two different edges lengths, $\frac{2}{3}a$ and $\frac{4}{3}a$. Its surface area $A$ and volume $V$ are given by
$$A = 8\sqrt{2} a^2 \approx 11.314a^2, \quad V = \frac{16}{9}\sqrt{3} a^3 \approx 3.079a^3.$$

== Variations ==
The trapezo-rhombic dodecahedron can be seen as an elongation of another dodecahedron, which can be called a rhombo-triangular dodecahedron, with 6 rhombi (or squares) and 6 triangles. It also has D_{3h} symmetry and is space-filling. It has 21 edges and 11 vertices. With square faces, it can be seen as a cube split across the 3-fold axis, separated with the two halves rotated 180°, and filling the gaps with triangles. When used as a space-filler, connecting dodecahedra on their triangles leaves two cubical step surfaces on the top and bottom, which can connect with complementary steps. A concave form of the trapezo-rhombic dodecahedron can also be constructed, which are the cells in the first image of the following table.

== See also ==
- Elongated dodecahedron
- Hexagonal prismatic honeycomb
