= List of shapes with known packing constant =

The packing constant of a geometric body is the largest average density achieved by packing arrangements of congruent copies of the body. For most bodies the value of the packing constant is unknown. The following is a list of bodies in Euclidean spaces whose packing constant is known. Fejes Tóth proved that in the plane, a point symmetric body has a packing constant that is equal to its translative packing constant and its lattice packing constant. Therefore, any such body for which the lattice packing constant was previously known, such as any ellipse, consequently has a known packing constant. In addition to these bodies, the packing constants of hyperspheres in 8 and 24 dimensions are almost exactly known.

Image	Description	Dimension	Packing constant	Comments
	Monohedral prototiles	all	1	Shapes such that congruent copies can form a tiling of space
	Circle, Ellipse	2	π/√12 ≈ 0.906900	Proof attributed to Thue
	Regular pentagon	2	$\frac{5 - \sqrt{5}}{3} \approx 0.92131$	Thomas Hales and Wöden Kusner
	Smoothed octagon	2	$\eta_{so} = \frac{ 8-4\sqrt{2}-\ln{2} }{2\sqrt{2}-1} \approx 0.902414$	Reinhardt
	All 2-fold symmetric convex polygons	2		Linear-time (in number of vertices) algorithm given by Mount and Ruth Silverman
	Sphere	3	π/√18 ≈ 0.7404805	See Kepler conjecture
	Bi-infinite cylinder	3	π/√12 ≈ 0.906900	Bezdek and Kuperberg
	Half-infinite cylinder	3	π/√12 ≈ 0.906900	Wöden Kusner
	All shapes contained in a rhombic dodecahedron whose inscribed sphere is contained in the shape	3	Fraction of the volume of the rhombic dodecahedron filled by the shape	Corollary of Kepler conjecture. Examples pictured: rhombicuboctahedron and rhombic enneacontahedron.
	Hypersphere	8	$\frac{(\frac {\pi}{2})^4}{4!} \approx 0.2536695$	See Hypersphere packing
	Hypersphere	24	$\frac{(\frac {\pi}{2})^{12}}{12!} \approx 0.000000471087$	See Hypersphere packing
