= The Pursuit of Perfect Packing =

Book on packing problems in geometry

- Author: Tomaso Aste and Denis Weaire
- Subject: Geometry
- Genre: Mathematics
- Publisher: Institute of Physics Publishing
- Publication date: 2000
- ISBN: 0-7503-0648-3

The Pursuit of Perfect Packing is a book on packing problems in geometry. It was written by physicists Tomaso Aste and Denis Weaire and published in 2000 by Institute of Physics Publishing (doi:10.1887/0750306483, ISBN 0-7503-0648-3) with a second edition published in 2008 by Taylor & Francis (ISBN 978-1-4200-6817-7).

== Topics ==
The mathematical topics described in the book include sphere packing (including the Tammes problem, the Kepler conjecture, and higher-dimensional sphere packing), the Honeycomb conjecture and the Weaire–Phelan structure, Voronoi diagrams and Delaunay triangulations, Apollonian gaskets, random sequential adsorption, and the physical realizations of some of these structures by sand, soap bubbles, the seeds of plants, and columnar basalt. A broader theme involves the contrast between locally ordered and locally disordered structures, and the interplay between local and global considerations in optimal packings.

As well, the book includes biographical sketches of some of the contributors to this field, and histories of their work in this area, including Johannes Kepler, Stephen Hales, Joseph Plateau, Lord Kelvin, Osborne Reynolds, and J. D. Bernal.

== Audience and reception ==
The book is aimed at a general audience rather than to professional mathematicians. Therefore, it avoids mathematical proofs and is otherwise not very technical. However, it contains pointers to the mathematical literature where readers more expert in these topics can find more detail. Avoiding proof may have been a necessary decision as some proofs in this area defy summarization: the proof by Thomas Hales of the Kepler conjecture on optimal sphere packing in three dimensions, announced shortly before the publication of the book and one of its central topics, is hundreds of pages long.

Reviewer Johann Linhart complains that (in the first edition) some figures are inaccurately drawn. And although finding the book "entertaining and easy to read", William Satzer finds it "frustrating" in the lack of detail in its stories. Nevertheless, Linhart and reviewer Stephen Blundell highly recommend the book, and reviewer Charles Radin calls it "a treasure trove of intriguing examples" and "a real gem". And despite complaining about a format that mixes footnote markers into mathematical formulas, and the illegibility of some figures, Michael Fox recommends it to "any mathematics or science library".
