= Atomic packing factor =

Crystallography concept

In crystallography, atomic packing factor (APF), packing efficiency, or packing fraction is the fraction of volume in a crystal structure that is occupied by constituent particles. It is a dimensionless quantity and always less than unity. In atomic systems, by convention, the APF is determined by assuming that atoms are rigid spheres. The radius of the spheres is taken to be the maximum value such that the atoms do not overlap. For one-component crystals (those that contain only one type of particle), the packing fraction is represented mathematically by

$$\mathrm{APF} = \frac{N_\mathrm{particle} V_\mathrm{particle}}{V_\text{unit cell}}$$

where N_{particle} is the number of particles in the unit cell, V_{particle} is the volume of each particle, and V_{unit cell} is the volume occupied by the unit cell. It can be proven mathematically that for one-component structures, the most dense arrangement of atoms has an APF of about 0.74 (see Kepler conjecture), obtained by the close-packed structures. For multiple-component structures (such as with interstitial alloys), the APF can exceed 0.74.

The atomic packing factor of a unit cell is relevant to the study of materials science, where it explains many properties of materials. For example, metals with a high atomic packing factor will have a higher "workability" (malleability or ductility), similar to how a road is smoother when the stones are closer together, allowing metal atoms to slide past one another more easily.

== Single component crystal structures ==
Common sphere packings taken on by atomic systems are listed below with their corresponding packing fraction.

- Hexagonal close-packed (HCP): 0.74
- Face-centered cubic (FCC): 0.74 (also called cubic close-packed, CCP)
- Body-centered cubic (BCC): 0.68
- Simple cubic: 0.52
- Diamond cubic: 0.34

The majority of metals take on either the HCP, FCC, or BCC structure.

Simple cubic unit cell

=== Simple cubic ===
For a simple cubic packing, the number of atoms per unit cell is one. The side of the unit cell is of length 2r, where r is the radius of the atom.

$$\begin{align}
\mathrm{APF} &= \frac{N_\mathrm{atoms}V_\mathrm{atom}}{V_\text{unit cell}} = \frac{1\cdot\frac43\pi r^3}{\left(2r\right)^3} \\[10pt]
&= \frac{\pi}{6} \approx 0.5236 \end{align}$$

=== Face-centered cubic ===
FCC structure

For a face-centered cubic unit cell, the number of atoms is four. A line can be drawn from the top corner of a cube diagonally to the bottom corner on the same side of the cube, which is equal to 4r. Using geometry, and the side length, a can be related to r as:

$$a = {2r}{\sqrt{2}}\, .$$

Knowing this and the formula for the volume of a sphere, it becomes possible to calculate the APF as follows:

$$\begin{align}
\mathrm{APF} &= \frac{N_\mathrm{atoms}V_\mathrm{atom}}{V_\text{unit cell}} = \frac{4\cdot\frac43\pi r^3}{\left({2r\sqrt2}\right)^3} \\[10pt]
&= \frac{\pi}{3\sqrt{2}} \approx 0.740\,48048\ . \end{align}$$

=== Body-centered cubic ===
BCC structure

The primitive unit cell for the body-centered cubic crystal structure contains several fractions taken from nine atoms (if the particles in the crystal are atoms): one on each corner of the cube and one atom in the center. Because the volume of each of the eight corner atoms is shared between eight adjacent cells, each BCC cell contains the equivalent volume of two atoms (one central and one on the corner).

Each corner atom touches the center atom. A line that is drawn from one corner of the cube through the center and to the other corner passes through 4r, where r is the radius of an atom. By geometry, the length of the diagonal is a√3. Therefore, the length of each side of the BCC structure can be related to the radius of the atom by

$$a = \frac{4r}{\sqrt{3}}\, .$$

Knowing this and the formula for the volume of a sphere, it becomes possible to calculate the APF as follows:

$$\begin{align}
\mathrm{APF} &= \frac{N_\mathrm{atoms}V_\mathrm{atom}}{V_\text{unit cell}} = \frac{2\cdot\frac43\pi r^3}{\left(\frac{4r}{\sqrt{3}} \right)^3} \\[10pt]
&= \frac{\pi\sqrt{3}}{8} \approx 0.680\,174\,762\, . \end{align}$$

=== Hexagonal close-packed ===
HCP structure

For the hexagonal close-packed structure the derivation is similar. Here the unit cell (equivalent to 3 primitive unit cells) is a hexagonal prism containing six atoms (if the particles in the crystal are atoms). Indeed, three are the atoms in the middle layer (inside the prism); in addition, for the top and bottom layers (on the bases of the prism), the central atom is shared with the adjacent cell, and each of the six atoms at the vertices is shared with other six adjacent cells. So the total number of atoms in the cell is 3 + (1/2)×2 + (1/6)×6×2 = 6. Each atom touches other twelve atoms. Now let $a\$be the side length of the base of the prism and $c\$be its height. The latter is twice the distance between adjacent layers, i. e., twice the height of the regular tetrahedron whose vertices are occupied by (say) the central atom of the lower layer, two adjacent non-central atoms of the same layer, and one atom of the middle layer "resting" on the previous three. Obviously, the edge of this tetrahedron is $a\$. If $a = 2r\$, then its height can be easily calculated to be $\sqrt{\tfrac83}a\$, and, therefore, $c = 4\sqrt{\tfrac23}r\$ . So the volume of the hcp unit cell turns out to be (3/2)√3 $a^2 c\$ , that is 24√2 $r^3\$ .

It is then possible to calculate the APF as follows:

$$\begin{align}
\mathrm{APF} &= \frac{N_\mathrm{atoms}V_\mathrm{atom}}{V_\text{unit cell}} = \frac{6\cdot \frac43\pi r^3}{\frac{3\sqrt{3}}{2}a^2c} \\[10pt]
&= \frac{6 \cdot\frac43\pi r^3}{\frac{3\sqrt{3}}{2}(2r)^2\sqrt{\frac23}\cdot 4r} = \frac{6 \cdot\frac43\pi r^3}{\frac{3\sqrt{3}}{2} \sqrt{\frac23}\cdot 16r^3} \\[10pt]
&= \frac{\pi}{\sqrt{18}} = \frac{\pi}{3\sqrt{2}} \approx 0.740\,480\,48\, . \end{align}$$

== See also ==
- Crystal
- Packing density
- Random close packing
- Cubic crystal system
- Diamond cubic
- Percolation threshold
