= Close-packing of equal spheres =

Dense arrangement of congruent spheres in an infinite, regular arrangement

Illustration of the close-packing of equal spheres in both HCP (left) and FCC (right) lattices

In geometry, close-packing of equal spheres is a dense arrangement of congruent spheres in an infinite, regular arrangement (or lattice). Carl Friedrich Gauss proved that the highest average density – that is, the greatest fraction of space occupied by spheres – that can be achieved by a lattice packing is $\frac{\pi}{3\sqrt 2} \approx 0.74048$. The same packing density can also be achieved by alternate stackings of the same close-packed planes of spheres, including structures that are aperiodic in the stacking direction. The Kepler conjecture states that this is the highest density that can be achieved by any arrangement of spheres, either regular or irregular. This conjecture was proven by Thomas Hales. The highest density is so far known only for 1, 2, 3, 8, and 24 dimensions.

Many crystal structures are based on a close-packing of a single kind of atom, or a close-packing of large ions with smaller ions filling the spaces between them. The cubic and hexagonal arrangements are very close to one another in energy, and it may be difficult to predict which form will be preferred from first principles.

== FCC and HCP lattices ==
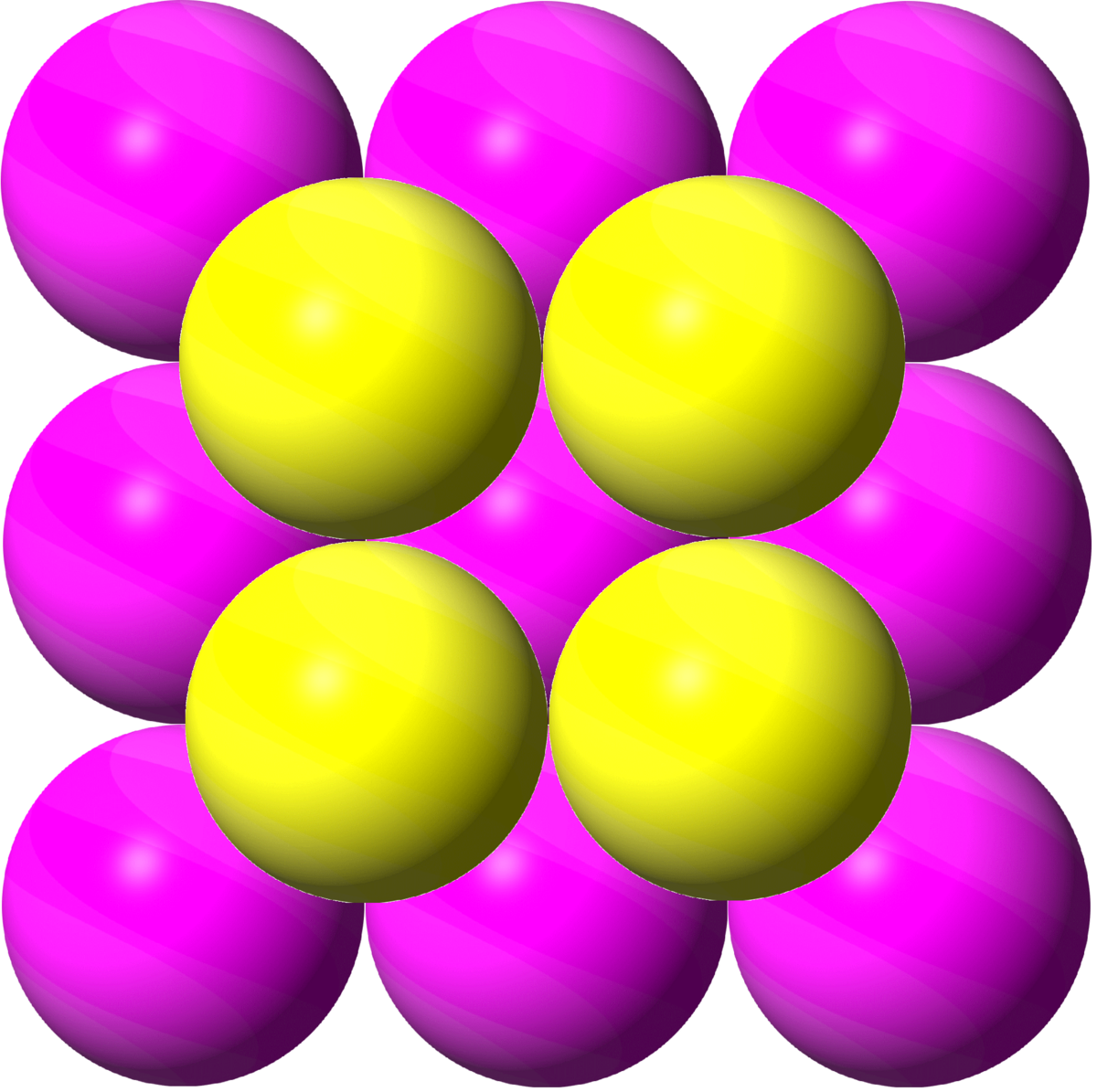
FCC lattice seen on 4-fold axis direction

FCC	HCP
The FCC arrangement can be oriented in two different planes, square or triangular. These can be seen in the cuboctahedron with 12 vertices representing the positions of 12 neighboring spheres around one central sphere. The HCP arrangement can be seen in the triangular orientation, but alternates two positions of spheres, in a triangular orthobicupola arrangement.

There are two simple regular lattices that achieve this highest average density. They are called face-centered cubic (FCC) (also called cubic close packed (CCP) and hexagonal close-packed (HCP), based on their symmetry. Both are based upon sheets of spheres arranged at the vertices of a triangular tiling; they differ in how the sheets are stacked upon one another. The FCC lattice is also known to mathematicians as that generated by the A_{3} root system.

=== Cannonball problem ===
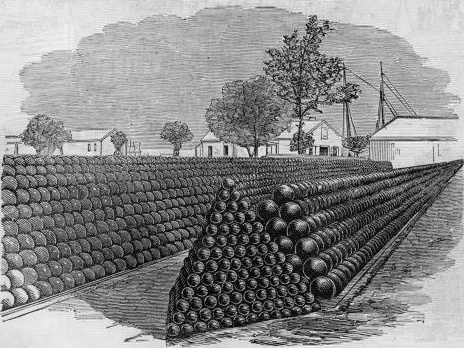
Cannonballs piled on a triangular (front) and rectangular (back) base, both FCC lattices

The problem of close-packing of spheres was first mathematically analyzed by Thomas Harriot around 1587, after a question on piling cannonballs on ships was posed to him by Sir Walter Raleigh on their expedition to America. Cannonballs were usually piled in a rectangular or triangular wooden frame, forming a three-sided or four-sided pyramid. Both arrangements produce face-centered cubic lattices, but with different orientations to the ground. Hexagonal close-packing would result in a pyramid with a hexagonal base.

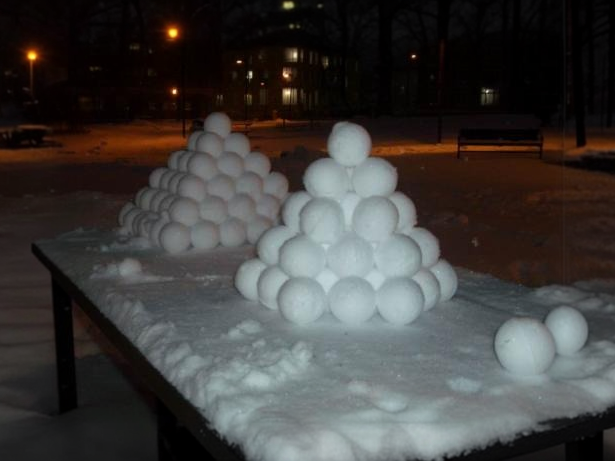
The front snowball pyramid is hexagonal close-packed and rear is face-centered cubic.

The cannonball problem asks which flat square arrangements of cannonballs can be stacked into a square pyramid. Édouard Lucas formulated the problem as the Diophantine equation

$$\sum_{n=1}^{N} n^2 = M^2$$

or, equivalently,

$$\frac{1}{6} N(N+1)(2N+1) = \frac{2N^3+3N^2+N}{6} = M^2$$

and conjectured that the only solutions are $N = 1, M = 1,$ and $N = 24, M = 70$. Here $N$ is the number of layers in the pyramidal stacking arrangement and $M$ is the number of cannonballs along an edge in the flat square arrangement.

=== Positioning and spacing ===
In both the FCC and HCP arrangements each sphere has twelve neighbors. For spheres of radius 1, there are

- Six large octahedral interstitial gaps surrounded by six other spheres, where the distance from the centers of the gap to the centers of the surrounding spheres is √{2}
- Eight small tetrahedral interstitial gaps surrounded by four other spheres, where the distance from the centers of the gap to the centers of the surrounding spheres is √3/2

For every N spheres, there are N octahedral gaps and 2N tetrahedral gaps.

Relative to a reference layer with positioning A, two more positionings B and C are possible. Every sequence of A, B, and C without immediate repetition of the same one is possible and gives an equally dense packing for spheres of a given radius.

The most regular ones are

- FCC = ABC ABC ABC... (every third layer is the same)
- HCP = AB AB AB AB... (every other layer is the same).

There is an uncountably infinite number of disordered arrangements of planes (e.g. ABCACBABABAC...) that are sometimes collectively referred to as "Barlow packings", after crystallographer William Barlow.

In close-packing, the center-to-center spacing of spheres in the xy plane is a simple honeycomb-like tessellation with a pitch (distance between sphere centers) of one sphere diameter. The distance between sphere centers, projected on the z (vertical) axis, is:

$$\text{pitch}_Z = \sqrt{6} \cdot {d\over 3}\approx0.816\,496\,58 d,$$

where d is the diameter of a sphere; this follows from the tetrahedral arrangement of close-packed spheres.

The coordination number of HCP and FCC is 12 and their atomic packing factors (APFs) are equal to the number mentioned above, 0.74.

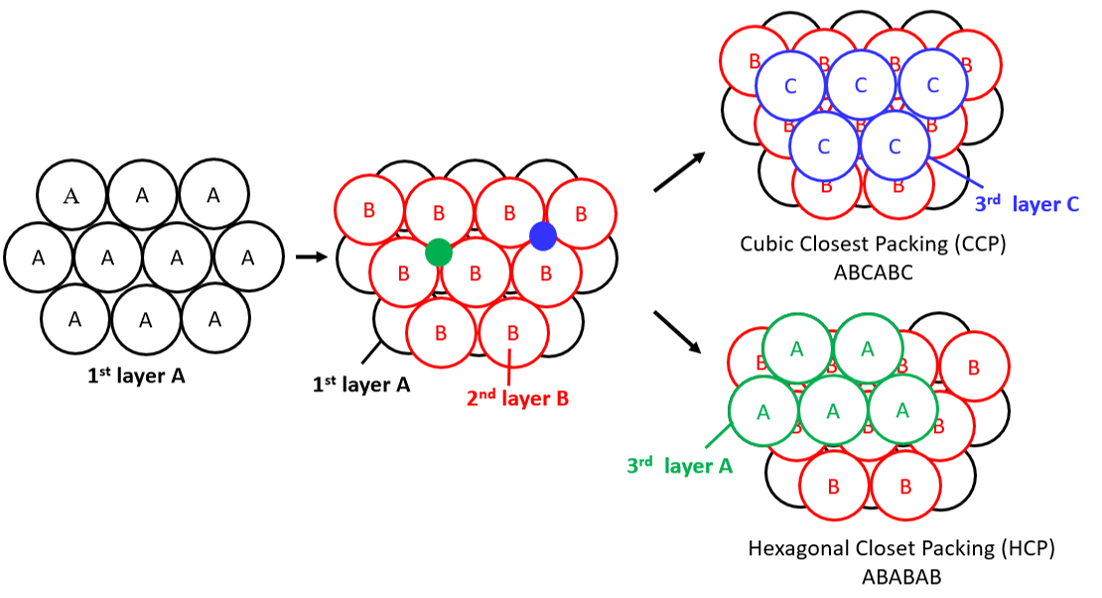
Cubic Close Packing (CCP) and Hexagonal Close Packing (HCP)

== Lattice generation ==
Figure 1 The HCP lattice (left) and the FCC lattice (right). The outline of each respective Bravais lattice is shown in red. The letters indicate which layers are the same. There are two "A" layers in the HCP matrix, where all the spheres are in the same position. All three layers in the FCC stack are different. Note the FCC stacking may be converted to the HCP stacking by translation of the upper-most sphere, as shown by the dashed outline.

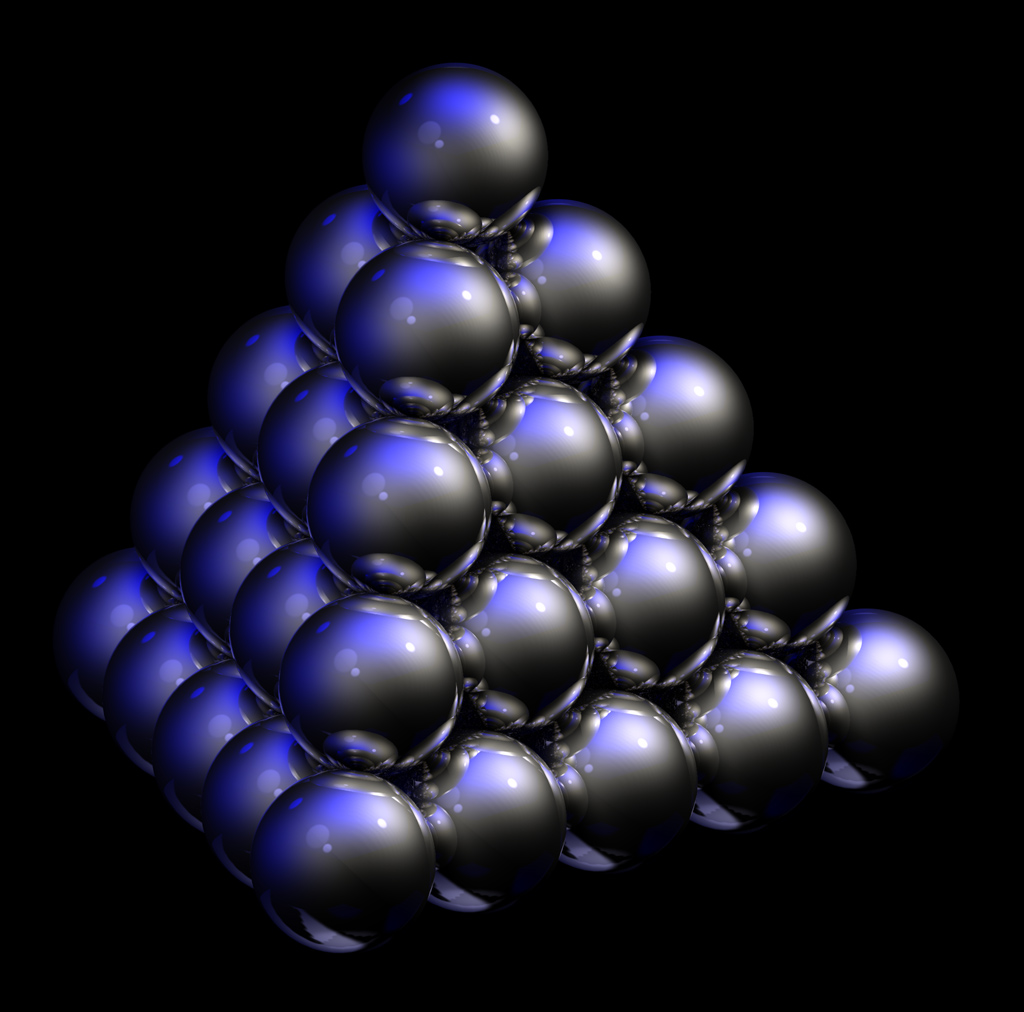
Figure 2 Thomas Harriot in ca. 1585 first pondered the mathematics of the cannonball arrangement or cannonball stack, which has an FCC lattice. Note how the two balls facing the viewer in the second tier from the top contact the same ball in the tier below. This does not occur in an HCP lattice (the left organization in Figure 1 above, and Figure 4 below).

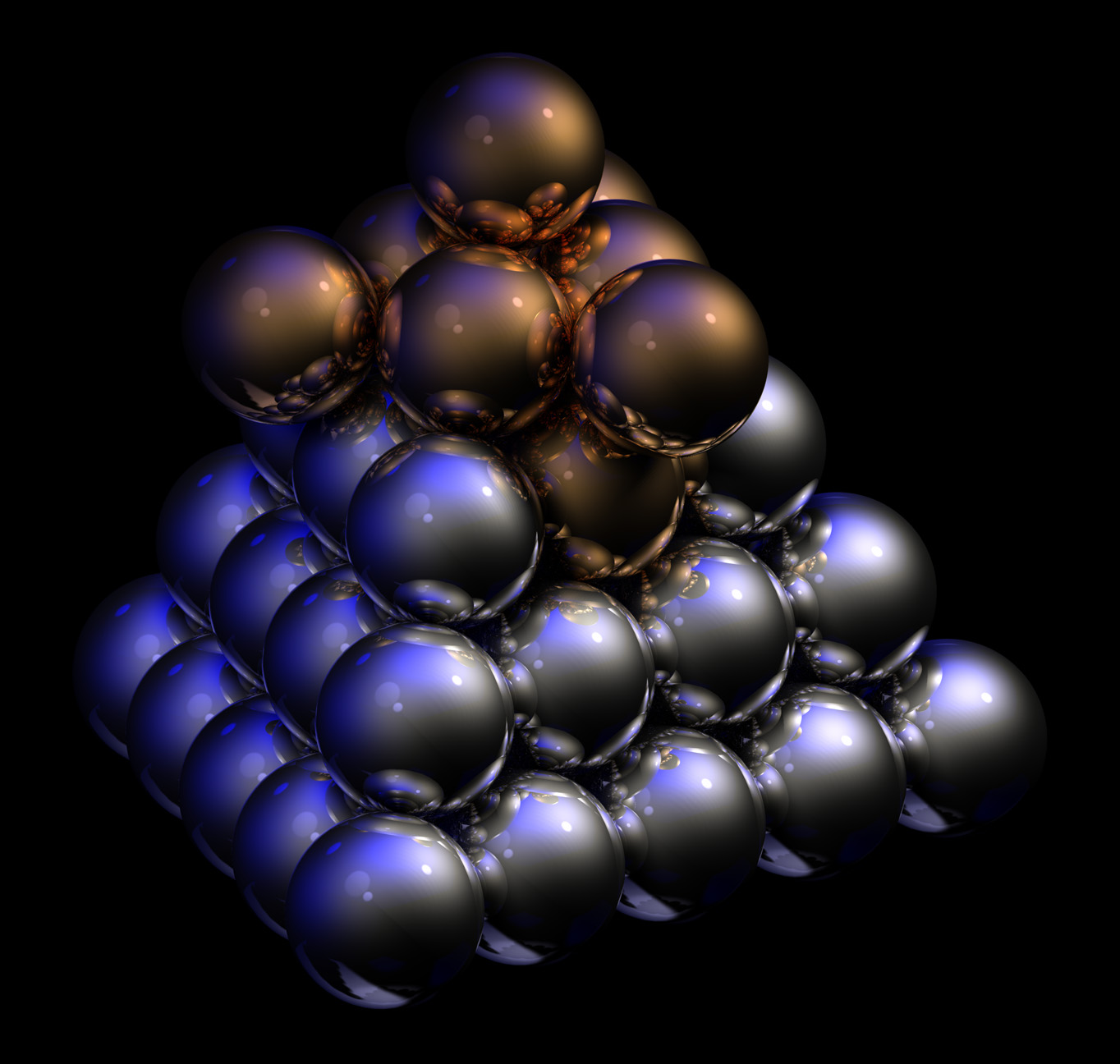
Figure 3 Shown here is a modified form of the cannonball stack wherein three extra spheres have been added to show all eight spheres in the top three tiers of the FCC lattice diagramed in Figure 1.

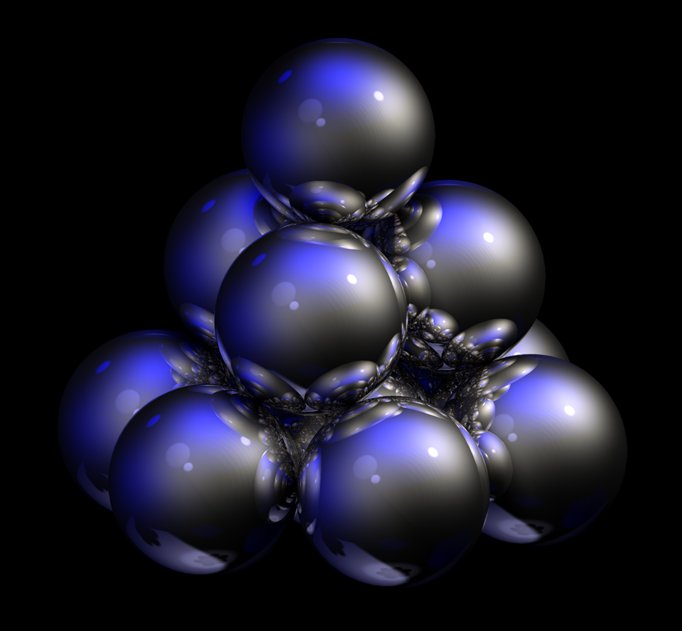
Figure 4 Shown here are all eleven spheres of the HCP lattice illustrated in Figure 1. The difference between this stack and the top three tiers of the cannonball stack all occurs in the bottom tier, which is rotated half the pitch diameter of a sphere (60°). Note how the two balls facing the viewer in the second tier from the top do not contact the same ball in the tier below.

Figure 5 This animated view helps illustrate the three-sided pyramidal (tetrahedral) shape of the cannonball arrangement.

When forming any sphere-packing lattice, the first fact to notice is that whenever two spheres touch a straight line may be drawn from the center of one sphere to the center of the other intersecting the point of contact. The distance between the centers along the shortest path namely that straight line will therefore be r_{1} + r_{2} where r_{1} is the radius of the first sphere and r_{2} is the radius of the second. In close packing all of the spheres share a common radius, r. Therefore, two centers would simply have a distance 2r.

=== Simple HCP lattice ===
An animation of close-packing lattice generation. Note: If a third layer (not shown) is directly over the first layer, then the HCP lattice is built. If the third layer is placed over holes in the first layer, then the FCC lattice is created.

To form an A-B-A-B-... hexagonal close packing of spheres, the coordinate points of the lattice will be the spheres' centers. Suppose, the goal is to fill a box with spheres according to HCP. The box would be placed on the x-y-z coordinate space.

First form a row of spheres. The centers will all lie on a straight line. Their x-coordinate will vary by 2r since the distance between each center of the spheres are touching is 2r. The y-coordinate and z-coordinate will be the same. For simplicity, say that the balls are the first row and that their y- and z-coordinates are simply r, so that their surfaces rest on the zero-planes. Coordinates of the centers of the first row will look like (2r, r, r), (4r, r, r), (6r ,r, r), (8r ,r, r), ... .

Now, form the next row of spheres. Again, the centers will all lie on a straight line with x-coordinate differences of 2r, but there will be a shift of distance r in the x-direction so that the center of every sphere in this row aligns with the x-coordinate of where two spheres touch in the first row. This allows the spheres of the new row to slide in closer to the first row until all spheres in the new row are touching two spheres of the first row. Since the new spheres touch two spheres, their centers form an equilateral triangle with those two neighbors' centers. The side lengths are all 2r, so the height or y-coordinate difference between the rows is √3r. Thus, this row will have the coordinates for the nth center, starting from 0, of (2n + 1)r, r + √3r, r:

(r, r + √3r, r), (3r, r + √3r, r), (5r, r + √3r, r), ...

The first sphere of this row only touches one sphere in the original row, but its location follows suit with the rest of the row.

The next row follows this pattern of shifting the x-coordinate by r and the y-coordinate by √3. Add rows until reaching the x and y maximum borders of the box.

In an A-B-A-B-... stacking pattern, the odd numbered planes of spheres will have exactly the same coordinates save for a pitch difference in the z-coordinates and the even numbered planes of spheres will share the same x- and y-coordinates. Both types of planes are formed using the pattern mentioned above, but the starting place for the first row's first sphere will be different.

Using the plane described precisely above as plane #1, the A plane, place a sphere on top of this plane so that it lies touching three spheres in the A-plane. The three spheres are all already touching each other, forming an equilateral triangle, and since they all touch the new sphere, the four centers form a regular tetrahedron. All of the sides are equal to 2r because all of the sides are formed by two spheres touching. The height of which or the z-coordinate difference between the two "planes" is √6r2/3. This, combined with the offsets in the x and y-coordinates, gives the centers of the first row in the B plane:

(r, r + 1/√3r, r + 2√2/3r), (3r, r + 1/√3r, r + 2√2/3r), (5r, r + 1/√3r, r + 2√2/3r), ...

The second row's coordinates follow the pattern first described above and are:

(2r, r + 4/√3r, r + 2√2/3r), (4r, r + 4/√3r, r + 2√2/3r), (6r, r + 4/√3r, r + 2√2/3r), ...

The difference to the next plane, the A plane, is again 2√2/3r in the z-direction and a shift in the x and y to match those x- and y-coordinates of the first A plane.

In general, the coordinates of sphere centers can be written as:

$$\begin{bmatrix}
2i + \bigl((j\ +\ k) \bmod 2\bigr)\\
\sqrt{3}j + \frac{k \bmod 2}{\sqrt3}\\
2\sqrt{\frac{2}{3}}k\\
\end{bmatrix}r$$

where i, j, and k are indices starting at 0 for the x-, y-, and z-coordinates.

== Miller indices ==
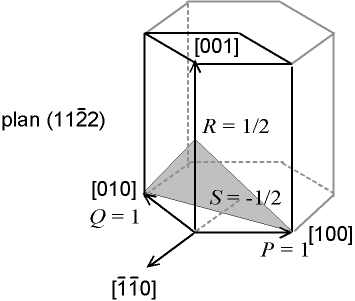
Miller–Bravais index for HCP lattice

Crystallographic features of HCP systems, such as vectors and atomic plane families, can be described using a four-value Miller index notation ( hkil ) in which the third index i denotes a degenerate but convenient component which is equal to −h − k. The h, i and k index directions are separated by 120°, and are thus not orthogonal; the l component is mutually perpendicular to the h, i and k index directions.

== Filling the remaining space ==
The FCC and HCP packings are the densest known packings of equal spheres with the highest symmetry (smallest repeat units). Denser sphere packings are known, but they involve unequal sphere packing. A packing density of 1, filling the space completely, requires non-spherical shapes, such as honeycombs.

Replacing each contact point between two spheres with an edge connecting the centers of the touching spheres produces tetrahedrons and octahedrons of equal edge lengths. The FCC arrangement produces the tetrahedral-octahedral honeycomb. The HCP arrangement produces the gyrated tetrahedral-octahedral honeycomb. If, instead, every sphere is augmented with the points in space that are closer to it than to any other sphere, the duals of these honeycombs are produced: the rhombic dodecahedral honeycomb for FCC, and the trapezo-rhombic dodecahedral honeycomb for HCP.

Spherical bubbles appear in soapy water in a FCC or HCP arrangement when the water in the gaps between the bubbles drains out. This pattern also approaches the rhombic dodecahedral honeycomb or trapezo-rhombic dodecahedral honeycomb. However, such FCC or HCP foams of very small liquid content are unstable, as they do not satisfy Plateau's laws. The Kelvin foam and the Weaire–Phelan foam are more stable, having smaller interfacial energy in the limit of a very small liquid content.

There are two types of interstitial holes left by HCP and FCC conformations: tetrahedral and octahedral void. Four spheres surround the tetrahedral hole with three spheres being in one layer and one sphere from the next layer. Six spheres surround an octahedral voids with three spheres coming from one layer and three spheres coming from the next layer. Structures of many simple chemical compounds, for instance, are often described in terms of small atoms occupying tetrahedral or octahedral holes in closed-packed systems that are formed from larger atoms.

Layered structures are formed by alternating empty and filled octahedral planes. Two octahedral layers usually allow for four structural arrangements that can either be filled by an HCP of FCC packing systems. In filling tetrahedral holes a complete filling leads to fcc field array. In unit cells, hole filling can sometimes lead to polyhedral arrays with a mix of HCP and FCC layering.

== See also ==
- Cubic crystal system
- Hermite constant
- Random close pack
- Sphere packing
- Cylinder sphere packing
