= Dodecahedral conjecture =

Theorem on the minimal volume of cells in the Voronoi decomposition of packed spheres

The dodecahedral conjecture in geometry is intimately related to sphere packing.

László Fejes Tóth, a 20th-century Hungarian geometer, considered the Voronoi decomposition of any given packing of unit spheres. He conjectured in 1943 that the minimal volume of any cell in the resulting Voronoi decomposition was at least as large as the volume of a regular dodecahedron circumscribed to a unit sphere.

Thomas Callister Hales and Sean McLaughlin proved the conjecture in 1998, following the same strategy that led Hales to his proof of the Kepler conjecture. The proofs rely on extensive computations. McLaughlin was awarded the 1999 Morgan Prize for his contribution to this proof.
