= Packing fraction =

Packing fraction may refer to:

- Packing density, the fraction of the space filled by objects comprising the packing
- Atomic packing factor, the fraction of volume in a crystal structure that is occupied by the constituent particles
- Packing fraction (mass spectrometry), the atomic mass defect per nucleon
