= Denis Weaire =

Irish physicist

Denis Lawrence Weaire FRS (born 17 October 1942 in Dalhousie, Simla, India) is an Irish physicist and an emeritus professor of Trinity College Dublin (TCD).

Educated at the Belfast Royal Academy and Clare College, Cambridge (BA 1964, PhD 1968) he held positions at University of California, University of Chicago, Harvard and Yale, ultimately holding professorships at Heriot-Watt, and University College Dublin before becoming, in 1984, Erasmus Smith's Professor of Natural and Experimental Philosophy at TCD.

Together with his graduate student Robert Phelan, Weaire came up with a counter-example to Lord Kelvin's conjecture on which surface was the most economical way to divide space into cells of equal size with the least surface area. This counter-example is now referred to as the Weaire–Phelan structure. This structure was an integral part of the design of the aquatic centre used in the 2008 Olympics in Beijing.

In 1971, together with Michael Thorpe, he introduced the Weaire–Thorpe model for electronic structure calculations. This has found application in the theory of amorphous insulators.

Weaire is currently carrying out research in the field of foam physics. He has co-authored The Physics of Foams, Oxford University Press (2000) with Stefan Hutzler, and The Pursuit of Perfect Packing, IoP Press (2000) with Tomaso Aste. In this context he published several scientific articles on cylinder sphere packings.

In 2005, he was awarded the premier award of the Royal Irish Academy, the Cunningham Medal. Previous winners include William Rowan Hamilton.

In 2008, he won the Fernand Holweck Medal and Prize.

Weaire has a strong interest in the history of science and is a board member of the History of Physics group of the European Physical Society. He has edited several collections of historical essays, including a 2012 book on Edward Hutchinson Synge with Petros Florides and John F. Donegan.

== Relationship to Ira Einhorn ==
During the convicted murderer Ira Einhorn's time in Ireland, Weaire was his landlord. When Weaire found out about the accusations of murder that Einhorn faced in the U.S., he reported him to the FBI and evicted him. Weaire, and his relationship to Einhorn, was the subject of the 2004 TV show Interpol Investigates (episode entitled Fatal Compulsion). The part of 'Professor Dennis Weaire' was played by actor Robert Randolph Caton. He was previously depicted in the made-for-TV film The Hunt for the Unicorn Killer, which featured Naomi Watts as Holly Maddux, Kevin Anderson as Einhorn, and Ian D. Clark as Weaire.
