= Dilhan M. Kalyon =

Turkish-American chemical engineer and professor

- Born: Ankara, Turkey
- Education: Middle East Technical University (B.Eng.); McGill University (M.Eng., Ph.D.)
- Awards: Fellow, National Academy of Inventors (2025); Fellow, AIChE (2006); Fellow, SPE (2004)
- Scientific career
- Fields: Chemical engineering Rheology; Polymer engineering Biomedical engineering
- Institutions: Stevens Institute of Technology
- Website: www.stevens.edu/profile/dkalyon

Dilhan M. Kalyon is a Turkish-American chemical engineer and Institute Professor of chemical engineering and materials science at Stevens Institute of Technology in Hoboken, New Jersey. He is the founding director of the Highly Filled Materials Institute (HfMI) at Stevens, established in 1989.

== Early life and education ==
Kalyon attended Talas American Middle School and graduated from Tarsus American College in 1971. He earned a Bachelor of Engineering in Chemical Engineering from Middle East Technical University (METU) in Ankara in 1975. He later earned a Master of Engineering in 1977 and a Doctor of Philosophy in Chemical Engineering in 1980 from McGill University in Montreal, supported by a merit scholarship.

== Academic career ==
After completing his doctoral studies, Kalyon joined Stevens Institute of Technology in 1980. He became professor in 1990 and was named Institute Professor in 1999.

Kalyon founded the Highly Filled Materials Institute at Stevens in 1989 and has continued to serve as its director. In 2019, he was appointed Interim Vice Provost for Research, Innovation and Entrepreneurship at Stevens. He later served as Vice Provost of Research and Innovation from 2020 to 2022.

Kalyon has served on the editorial board of the Journal of Tissue Science and Engineering. He has also served as a member of the Research and Development Council of New Jersey and as a director of the educational nonprofit FABSIT.

== Research and contributions ==
Kalyon's research centers on rheology, simulation, and processing of complex fluids, particularly highly filled suspensions containing rigid particles at concentrations approaching their maximum packing fraction. His work combines mathematical modeling, simulation, experimental studies using industrial-scale processing equipment, and analysis of microstructural distributions and final material properties.

His research on viscoplastic fluids has addressed materials that remain rigid below a critical yield stress and flow above it. His group has developed rheological characterization methods, models for wall slip in concentrated suspensions, the Mooney-Kalyon Plot, and continuous extrusion-based approaches for processing highly filled materials.

In energetic materials, Kalyon has worked on continuous extrusion and mixing methods for propellants and other energetic formulations. He was a co-editor of Energetic Materials: Advanced Processing Technologies for Next-Generation Materials, published by CRC Press in 2017.

In biomaterials and tissue engineering, Kalyon and collaborators have developed extrusion, electrospinning, and melt electrowriting methods for functionally graded biomaterial scaffolds. His work has included scaffold designs for bone and osteochondral tissue engineering, bone graft substitutes, and biomaterial structures whose geometry can influence cell behavior.

Other areas of his work have included magnetic composites and electromagnetic-field mitigation, online rheology and microstructural analysis of concentrated suspensions, nanofiber manufacturing with nanoparticles, x-ray diffraction-based characterization of crystalline particle size distributions, intumescent materials, polymer nanocomposites, and methods for controlling the rheology and injectability of ceramic bone cement precursors.

== Awards and honors ==
- Fellow, Society of Plastics Engineers (2004)
- Founder's Award, Joint Ordnance Commanders Group (JOCG) Continuous Extrusion and Mixing Group (2004)
- Fellow, American Institute of Chemical Engineers (2006)
- Thomas Baron Award in Fluid-Particle Systems, AIChE, recognizing outstanding scientific or technical accomplishment with significant impact in fluid-particle systems (2008)
- International Research Award, Society of Plastics Engineers (2008)
- Schaefer School Research Funding Award, Stevens Institute of Technology (2024)
- Fellow, National Academy of Inventors (2025)
- Fellow, International Academy of Artificial Intelligence Sciences (2026)
