= Random close pack =

Packing method for objects

In geometry, random close-packing (RCP) of spheres is a dense arrangement of spheres without any long-range order. For example, when a solid container is filled with grain, shaking the container will reduce the volume taken up by the objects, thus allowing more grain to be added to the container, but the grain cannot be expected to have a regular arrangement; the result is a random close-packing. In other words, shaking increases the density of packed objects. But shaking cannot increase the density indefinitely, a limit is reached, and if this is reached without obvious packing into an ordered structure, such as a regular crystal lattice, this is the empirical random close-packed density for this particular procedure of packing.

Experiments and computer simulations have shown that the most compact way to pack hard perfect same-size spheres randomly gives a maximum volume fraction of about 64%; that is, approximately 64% of the volume of a container is occupied by the spheres. The problem of predicting theoretically the random close pack of spheres is difficult mainly because of the absence of a unique definition of randomness or disorder. The random close packing value is significantly below that of the densest possible close-packing, which is π/3√2 ≈ 74%, achieved by the face-centred cubic (fcc) and hexagonal close packed (hcp) crystal lattices, which can occur through the process of granular crystallisation.

The random close-packing fraction of discs in the plane has also been considered a theoretically unsolved problem because of similar difficulties. An analytical, though not in closed form, solution to this problem was found in 2021 by R. Blumenfeld. The solution was found by limiting the probability of growth of ordered clusters to be exponentially small and relating it to the distribution of "cells", which are the smallest voids surrounded by connected discs. The derived maximum volume fraction is 85.3542%, if only hexagonal lattice clusters are disallowed, and 85.2514% if one also disallows deformed square lattice clusters.

An analytical and closed-form solution for both 2D and 3D, mechanically stable, random packings of spheres was found by A. Zaccone in 2022 using the assumption that the most random branch of jammed states (maximally random jammed packings, extending up to the fcc close packing) undergo crowding in a way qualitatively similar to an equilibrium liquid. The reasons for the effectiveness of this solution are the object of ongoing debate.

== Definition ==
Random close packing of spheres does not have yet a precise geometric definition. It is defined statistically, and results are empirical. A container is randomly filled with objects, and then the container is shaken or tapped until the objects do not compact any further; at this point the packing state is RCP. The definition of packing fraction can be given as: "the volume taken by number of particles in a given space of volume". In other words, packing fraction defines the packing density. It has been shown that the filling fraction increases with the number of taps until the saturation density is reached. Also, the saturation density increases as the tapping amplitude decreases. Thus, RCP is the packing fraction given by the limit as the tapping amplitude goes to zero, and the limit as the number of taps goes to infinity.

== Effect of object shape ==
The particle volume fraction at RCP depends on the objects being packed. If the objects are polydispersed, then the volume fraction depends non-trivially on the size distribution and can be arbitrarily close to 1 in the limit of very large standard deviation of the size distribution. In practice, available analytical solutions and numerical simulations display a saturation plateau at volume fractions 0.96–0.99 for large values of the standard deviation. Still for (relatively) monodisperse objects, the value for RCP depends on the object shape; for spheres it is 0.64, for M&M's candy it is 0.68.

== For spheres ==
Comparison of various models of close sphere packing (monodispersed)
Model	Description	Void fraction	Packing density
Thinnest regular packing	cubic lattice (coordination number 6)	0.4764	0.5236
Very loose random packing	E.g., spheres slowly settled	0.44	0.56
Loose random packing	E.g., dropped into bed or packed by hand	0.40 to 0.41	0.59 to 0.60
Poured random packing	Spheres poured into bed	0.375 to 0.391	0.609 to 0.625
Close random packing	E.g., the bed vibrated	0.359 to 0.375	0.625 to 0.641
Densest regular packing	fcc or hcp lattice (Coordination number 12)	0.2595	0.7405

== Example ==
Products containing loosely packed items are often labeled with this message: "Contents May Settle During Shipping". Usually during shipping, the container will be bumped numerous times, which will increase the packing density. The message is added to assure the consumer that the container is full on a mass basis, even though the container appears slightly empty. Systems of packed particles are also used as a basic model of porous media.

== See also ==
- Close-packing of equal spheres
- Sphere packing
- Cylinder sphere packing
