= Sphere packing in a sphere =

Three-dimensional packing problem

Sphere packing in a sphere is a three-dimensional packing problem with the objective of packing a given number of equal spheres inside a unit sphere. It is the three-dimensional equivalent of the circle packing in a circle problem in two dimensions.

Number of inner spheres	Maximum radius of inner spheres		Packing density	Optimality	Arrangement	Diagram
Number of inner spheres	Exact form	Approximate	Packing density	Optimality	Arrangement	Diagram
1	$1$	1.0000	1	Trivially optimal.	Point	
2	$\dfrac {1} {2}$	0.5000	0.25	Trivially optimal.	Line segment	
3	$2 \sqrt {3} - 3$	0.4641...	0.29988...	Trivially optimal.	Triangle	
4	$\sqrt {6} - 2$	0.4494...	0.36326...	Proven optimal.	Tetrahedron	
5	$\sqrt {2} - 1$	0.4142...	0.35533...	Proven optimal.	Trigonal bipyramid	
6	$\sqrt {2} - 1$	0.4142...	0.42640...	Proven optimal.	Octahedron	
7	$\frac {1}{\frac {\sqrt {3} + 2 \cos \left( \frac {\pi}{18} \right)}{\sqrt {2 + 2 \sqrt {3} \cos \left( \frac {\pi}{18} \right)}} + 1}$	0.3859...	0.40231...	Proven optimal.	Capped octahedron	
8	$\frac {1}{\sqrt {2 + \frac {1}{\sqrt {2}}} + 1}$	0.3780...	0.43217...	Proven optimal.	Square antiprism	
9	$\frac {\sqrt {3} - 1}{2}$	0.3660...	0.44134...	Proven optimal.	Tricapped trigonal prism	
10	(Note: The exact formula can be found by substituting the Tammes problem solution $\theta_{10} = \arctan\left(\sqrt{3+\frac{4}{\sqrt{3}}\cos\left(\frac{1}{3}\arctan\left(\frac{\sqrt{687}}{9}\right)\right)}\right)$ into $r=\frac{\sin\left(\frac{\theta}{2}\right)}{1+\sin\left(\frac{\theta}{2}\right)}.$)	0.3530...	0.44005...	Proven optimal.	Sphenocorona	
11	$\dfrac {\sqrt{5} - 3} {2} + \sqrt{5 - 2 \sqrt{5} }$	0.3445...	0.45003...	Proven optimal.	Diminished icosahedron	
12	$\dfrac {\sqrt{5} - 3} {2} + \sqrt{5 - 2 \sqrt{5} }$	0.3445...	0.49095...	Proven optimal.	Icosahedron	
