= Packing density =

Fraction of a space filled by objects packed into that space

A packing density or packing fraction of a packing in some space is the fraction of the space filled by the figures making up the packing. In simplest terms, this is the ratio of the volume of bodies in a space to the volume of the space itself. In packing problems, the objective is usually to obtain a packing of the greatest possible density.

== In compact spaces ==
If $K_1,\dots, K_n$ are measurable subsets of a compact measure space $X$ and their interiors pairwise do not intersect, then the collection $[K_i]$ is a packing in $X$ and its packing density is
$$\eta=\frac{\sum_{i=1}^{n}\mu(K_i)}{\mu(X)}.$$

== In Euclidean space ==
If the space being packed is infinite in measure, such as Euclidean space, it is customary to define the density as the limit of densities exhibited in balls of larger and larger radii. If $B_t$ is the ball of radius $t$ centered at the origin, then the density of a packing $[K_i:i\in\N]$ is
$$\eta = \lim_{t\to\infty}\frac{\sum_{i=1}^{\infty}\mu(K_i\cap B_t)}{\mu(B_t)}.$$
Since this limit does not always exist, it is also useful to define the upper and lower densities as the limit superior and limit inferior of the above respectively. If the density exists, the upper and lower densities are equal. Provided that any ball of the Euclidean space intersects only finitely many elements of the packing and that the diameters of the elements are bounded from above, the (upper, lower) density does not depend on the choice of origin, and $\mu(K_i\cap B_t)$ can be replaced by $\mu(K_i)$ for every element that intersects $B_t$. The ball may also be replaced by dilations of some other convex body, but in general the resulting densities are not equal.

== Optimal packing density ==
One is often interested in packings restricted to use elements of a certain supply collection. For example, the supply collection may be the set of all balls of a given radius. The optimal packing density or packing constant associated with a supply collection is the supremum of upper densities obtained by packings that are subcollections of the supply collection. If the supply collection consists of convex bodies of bounded diameter, there exists a packing whose packing density is equal to the packing constant, and this packing constant does not vary if the balls in the definition of density are replaced by dilations of some other convex body.

A particular supply collection of interest is all Euclidean motions of a fixed convex body $K$. In this case, we call the packing constant the packing constant of $K$. The Kepler conjecture is concerned with the packing constant of 3-balls. Ulam's packing conjecture states that 3-balls have the lowest packing constant of any convex solid. All translations of a fixed body is also a common supply collection of interest, and it defines the translative packing constant of that body.

== See also ==
- Atomic packing factor
- Sphere packing
- List of shapes with known packing constant
