= List of books about polyhedra =

This is a list of books about polyhedra.

== Polyhedral models ==
=== Cut-out kits ===
- Jenkins, Gerald; Bear, Magdalen (1998). Paper Polyhedra in Colour. Tarquin. ISBN 1-899618-23-6. Advanced Polyhedra 1: The Final Stellation, ISBN 1-899618-61-9. Advanced Polyhedra 2: The Sixth Stellation, ISBN 1-899618-62-7. Advanced Polyhedra 3: The Compound of Five Cubes, ISBN 978-1-899618-63-7.
- Jenkins, Gerald; Wild, Anne (2000). Mathematical Curiosities. Tarquin. ISBN 1-899618-35-X. More Mathematical Curiosities, Tarquin, ISBN 1-899618-36-8. Make Shapes 1, ISBN 0-906212-00-6. Make Shapes 2, ISBN 0-906212-01-4.
- Smith, A. G. (1986). Cut and Assemble 3-D Geometrical Shapes: 10 Models in Full Color. Dover. Cut and Assemble 3-D Star Shapes, 1997. Easy-To-Make 3D Shapes in Full Color, 2000.
- Torrence, Eve (2011). Cut and Assemble Icosahedra: Twelve Models in White and Color. Dover.

=== Origami ===
- Fuse, Tomoko (1990). Unit Origami: Multidimensional Transformations. Japan Publications. ISBN 978-0-87040-852-6.
- Gurkewitz, Rona; Arnstein, Bennett (1996). 3D Geometric Origami: Modular Origami Polyhedra. Dover. ISBN 9780486135601. Multimodular Origami Polyhedra: Archimedeans, Buckyballs and Duality, 2002. Beginner's Book of Modular Origami Polyhedra: The Platonic Solids, 2008. Modular Origami Polyhedra, also with Lewis Simon, 2nd ed., 1999.
- Mitchell, David (1997). Mathematical Origami: Geometrical Shapes by Paper Folding. Tarquin. ISBN 978-1-899618-18-7.
- Montroll, John (2009). Origami Polyhedra Design. A K Peters. ISBN 9781439871065. A Plethora of Polyhedra in Origami, Dover, 2002.

=== Other model-making ===
- Cundy, H. M.; Rollett, A. P. (1952). Mathematical Models. Clarendon Press. 2nd ed., 1961. 3rd ed., Tarquin, 1981, ISBN 978-0-906212-20-2.
- Hilton, Peter; Pedersen, Jean (1988). Build Your Own Polyhedra. Addison-Wesley.
- Wenninger, Magnus (1971). Polyhedron Models. Cambridge University Press. 2nd ed., Polyhedron Models for the Classroom, 1974. Spherical Models, 1979. Dual Models, 1983.

== Mathematical studies ==
=== Introductory level and general audience ===
- Akiyama, Jin; Matsunaga, Kiyoko (2024). Treks into Intuitive Geometry: The World of Polygons and Polyhedra (2nd ed.). Singapore: Springer. ISBN 978-981-99-8607-1.
- Alsina, Claudi (2017). The Thousand Faces of Geometric Beauty: The Polyhedra. Our Mathematical World. Vol. 23. National Geographic. ISBN 978-84-473-8929-2.
- Britton, Jill (2001). Polyhedra Pastimes. Dale Seymour Publishing. ISBN 0-7690-2782-2.
- Cromwell, Peter R. (1997). Polyhedra. Cambridge University Press.
- Fetter, Ann E. (1991). The Platonic Solids Activity Book. Key Curriculum Press.
- Holden, Alan (1971). Shapes, Space and Symmetry. Dover, 1991.
- le Masne, Roger (2013). Les polyèdres, ou la beauté des mathématiques (in French) (4th ed.). Self-published.
- Miyazaki, Koji (1983). Katachi to kūkan: Tajigen sekai no kiseki (in Japanese). Wiley. Translated into English as An Adventure in Multidimensional Space: The Art and Geometry of Polygons, Polyhedra, and Polytopes, Wiley, 1986, and into German as Polyeder und Kosmos: Spuren einer mehrdimensionalen Welt, Vieweg, 1987.
- Pearce, Peter; Pearce, Susan (1979). Polyhedra Primer. Van Nostrand Reinhold. ISBN 978-0-442-26496-3.
- Pugh, Anthony (1976). Polyhedra: A Visual Approach. University of California Press.
- Radin, Dan (2008). The Platonic Solids Book. Self-published.
- Sutton, Daud (2002). Platonic & Archimedean Solids: The Geometry of Space. Wooden Books. ISBN 978-0802713865.

=== Textbooks ===
- Alexandrov, A. D. (2005). Convex Polyhedra. Springer. Translated from 1950 Russian edition.
- Beck, Matthias; Robins, Sinai (2007). Computing the Continuous Discretely: Integer-Point Enumeration in Polyhedra. Undergraduate Texts in Mathematics. Vol. 154. Springer. 2nd ed., 2015, ISBN 978-1-4939-2968-9.
- Brøndsted, Arne (1983). An Introduction to Convex Polytopes. Graduate Texts in Mathematics. Vol. 90. Springer.
- Coxeter, H. S. M. (1948). Regular Polytopes. Methuen. 2nd ed., Macmillan, 1963. 3rd ed., Dover, 1973.
- Fejes Tóth, László (1964). Regular Figures. Pergamon.
- Grünbaum, Branko (1967). Convex Polytopes. Wiley. 2nd ed., Springer, 2003.
- Lyusternik, Lazar (1956). Выпуклые фигуры и многогранники (in Russian). Gosudarstv. Izdat. Tehn.-Teor. Lit. Translated into English as Convex Figures and Polyhedra by T. Jefferson Smith, Dover, 1963 and by Donald L. Barnett, Heath, 1966.
- Pineda Villavicencio, Guillermo (2024). Polytopes and Graphs. Cambridge Studies in Advanced Mathematics. Vol. 211. Cambridge University Press. doi:10.1017/9781009257794. ISBN 978-1-009-25781-7.
- Roman, Tiberiu (1968). Reguläre und halbreguläre Polyeder [Regular and semiregular polyhedra] (in German). VEB Deutscher Verlag der Wissenschaften.
- Thomas, Rekha (2006). Lectures in Geometric Combinatorics. American Mathematical Society.
- Ziegler, Günter M. (1993). Lectures on Polytopes. Springer.

=== Monographs and special topics ===
- Coxeter, H. S. M.; du Val, P.; Flather, H. T.; Petrie, J. F. (1938). The Fifty-Nine Icosahedra. University of Toronto Studies, Mathematical Series. Vol. 6. University of Toronto Press. 2nd ed., Springer, 1982. 3rd ed., Tarquin, 1999.
- Coxeter, H. S. M. (1974). Regular Complex Polytopes. Cambridge University Press. 2nd ed., 1991.
- Demaine, Erik; O'Rourke, Joseph (2007). Geometric Folding Algorithms: Linkages, Origami, Polyhedra. Cambridge University Press.
- Deza, Michel; Grishukhin, Viatcheslav; Shtogrin, Mikhail (2004). Scale-Isometric Polytopal Graphs in Hypercubes and Cubic Lattices: Polytopes in Hypercubes and $\mathbb{Z}_n$. London: Imperial College Press. doi:10.1142/9781860945489. ISBN 1-86094-421-3.
- Lakatos, Imre (1976). Proofs and Refutations: The Logic of Mathematical Discovery. Cambridge University Press.
- McMullen, Peter (2020). Geometric Regular Polytopes. Encyclopedia of Mathematics and its Applications. Vol. 172. Cambridge University Press.
- McMullen, Peter; Schulte, Egon (2002). Abstract Regular Polytopes. Encyclopedia of Mathematics and its Applications. Vol. 92. Cambridge University Press.
- McMullen, Peter; Shephard, G. C. (1971). Convex Polytopes and the Upper Bound Conjecture. London Mathematical Society Lecture Note Series. Vol. 3. Cambridge University Press.
- Nef, Walter (1978). Beiträge zur Theorie der Polyeder: Mit Anwendungen in der Computergraphik [Contributions to the theory of the polyhedron, with applications in computer graphics] (in German). Herbert Lang.
- O'Rourke, Joseph; Vîlcu, Costin (2024). Reshaping Convex Polyhedra. Springer. arXiv:2107.03153. ISBN 978-3-031-47511-5.
- Rajwade, A. R. (2001). Convex Polyhedra with Regularity Conditions and Hilbert's Third Problem. Texts and Readings in Mathematics. Vol. 21. Hindustan Book Agency.
- Richter-Gebert, Jürgen (1996). Realization Spaces of Polytopes. Lecture Notes in Mathematics. Vol. 1643. Springer.
- Stewart, B. M. (1970). Adventures Among the Toroids. Self-published. 2nd ed., 1980.
- Wachman, Avraham; Burt, Michael; Kleinmann, M. (1974). Infinite Polyhedra. Technion. 2nd ed., 2005.
- Wu, Wen-tsün (1965). A Theory of Imbedding, Immersion, and Isotopy of Polytopes in a Euclidean Space. Science Press.
- Zalgaller, Viktor A. (1969). Convex Polyhedra with Regular Faces. Consultants Bureau. Translated and corrected from Zalgaller, V. A. (1967). Выпуклые многогранники с правильными гранями. Zapiski Naučnyh Seminarov Leningradskogo Otdelenija Matematičeskogo Instituta im. V. A. Steklova Akademii Nauk SSSR (LOMI) (in Russian). Vol. 2. Nauka.
- Zhizhin, Gennadiy Vladimirovich (2022). The Classes of Higher Dimensional Polytopes in Chemical, Physical, and Biological Systems. Advances in Chemical and Materials Engineering. IGI Global. ISBN 9781799883760.

=== Edited volumes ===
- Avis, David; Bremner, David; Deza, Antoine, eds. (2009). Polyhedral Computation. CRM Proceedings and Lecture Notes. Vol. 48. American Mathematical Society.
- Gabriel, Jean-François, ed. (1997). Beyond the Cube: The Architecture of Space Frames and Polyhedra. Wiley.
- Kalai, Gil; Ziegler, Günter M., eds. (2012). Polytopes - Combinatorics and Computation. DMV Seminar. Vol. 29. Springer.
- Senechal, Marjorie; Fleck, G., eds. (1988). Shaping Space: A Polyhedral Approach. Birkhauser. ISBN 0-8176-3351-0. 2nd ed., Shaping Space: Exploring Polyhedra in Nature, Art, and the Geometrical Imagination, Springer, 2013.
- Viana, Vera; Matos, Helena Mena; Xavier, João Pedro, eds. (2022). Polyhedra and Beyond: Contributions from Geometrias’19, Porto, Portugal, September 05-07. Trends in Mathematics. Birkhäuser.

== History ==
=== Early works ===
Listed in chronological order, and including some works shorter than book length:

- Plato. Timaeus (in Greek).
- Euclid. Elements (in Greek).
- Pappus of Alexandria (1589). Mathematicae collectiones, liber quintus. apud Franciscum de Franciscis Senensem.
- Della Francesca, Piero (1482–1492). De quinque corporibus regularibus [On the five regular bodies] (in Latin).
- Pacioli, Luca (1509). Divina proportione [Divine proportion] (in Italian).
- de Bovelles, Charles (1511). De mathematicis corporibus.
- Dürer, Albrecht (1525). Underweysung der Messung, mit dem Zirckel und Richtscheyt, in Linien, Ebenen und gantzen corporen, Viertes Buch (in German).
- Maurolico, Francesco (1537). Compaginationes solidorum regularium.
- Jamnitzer, Wenzel (1568). Perspectiva corporum regularium [Perspectives of the regular bodies].
- Kepler, Johannes (1619). Harmonices Mundi (in Latin). Translated into English as Harmonies of the World by C. G. Wallis (1939).
- Descartes, René (c. 1630). De solidorum elementis [On the elements of solids] (in Latin). Original manuscript lost; copy by Gottfried Wilhelm Leibniz reprinted and translated in Descartes on Polyhedra, Springer, 1982.
- Cowley, John Lodge (1758). An Appendix to Euclid's Elements in Seven Books, Containing Forty-two Copper-plates, In Which the Doctrine of Solids, Delivered in the XIth, XIIth, and XVth Books of Euclid, is Illustrated by New-invented Schemes Cut Out of Paste-Board. Watkins.
- Poinsot, Louis (1810). Mémoire sur les polygones et sur les polyèdres (in French).
- Marie, François-Charles-Michel (1835). Géométrie stéréographique, ou reliefs des polyèdres (in French). Paris. hdl:2027/ucm.531073766x.
- Schläfli, Ludwig (1901) [1852]. Graf, J. H. (ed.). Theorie der vielfachen Kontinuität. Republished by Cornell University Library historical math monographs 2010 (in German). Zürich, Basel: Georg & Co. ISBN 978-1-4297-0481-6.
- Wiener, Christian (1864). Über Vielecke und Vielflache. Teubner.
- Catalan, Eugène (1865). "Mémoire sur la théorie des polyèdres". Journal de l'École Polytechnique (in French). 24. hdl:2268/194785.
- Hess, Edmund (1883). Einleitung in die Lehre von der Kugelteilung mit besonderer Berücksichtigung ihrer Anwendung auf die Theorie der Gleichflächigen und der gleicheckigen Polyeder (in German). Teubner.
- Klein, Felix (1884). Vorlesungen über das Ikosaeder und die Auflösung der Gleichungen vom 5ten Grade [Lectures on the Icosahedron and the Solution of Equations of the Fifth Degree] (in German).
- Fedorov, E. S. (1885). Начала учения о фигурах [Introduction to the Theory of Figures] (in Russian).
- Gorham, John (1888). A System for the Construction of Crystal Models on the Type of an Ordinary Plait: Exemplified by the Forms Belonging to the Six Axial Systems in Crystallography. Reprint, Tarquin, 2007, ISBN 978-1-899618-68-2.
- Eberhard, Victor (1891). Zur Morphologie der Polyeder [On the morphology of polyhedra]. Teubner.
- von Lindemann, Ferdinand (1897). Zur Geschichte der Polyeder und der Zahlzeichen [History of Polyhedra and Numeral Signs] (in German). Munich: F. Straub. Reprinted from Sitz. Bay. Akad. Wiss. 1896, pp. 625–758.
- Brückner, Max (1900). Vielecke und Vielflache: Theorie und Geschichte (in German). Treubner. Über die gleicheckig-gleichflächigen diskontinuierlichen und nichtkonvexen Polyeder, 1906.
- Steinitz, Ernst (1934). Rademacher, Hans (ed.). Vorlesungen über die Theorie der Polyeder unter Einschluss der Elemente der Topologie (in German).

=== Books about historical topics ===
- Andrews, Noam (2022). The Polyhedrists: Art and Geometry in the Long Sixteenth Century. MIT Press.
- Davis, Margaret Daly (1977). Piero della Francesca's Mathematical Treatises: The "Trattato d'abaco" and "Libellus de quinque corporibus regularibus". Longo.
- Dézarnaud-Dandine, Christine; Sevin, Alain (2009). Histoire des polyèdres: Quand la nature est géomètre (in French). Vuibert.
- Federico, Pasquale Joseph (1984). Descartes on Polyhedra: A Study of the "De solidorum elementis". Sources in the History of Mathematics and Physical Sciences. Vol. 4. Springer.
- Richeson, D. S. (2008). Euler's Gem: The Polyhedron Formula and the Birth of Topology. Princeton University Press.
- Sanders, Philip Morris (1990). The Regular Polyhedra in Renaissance Science and Philosophy. Warburg Institute, University of London.
- Wade, David (2012). Fantastic Geometry: Polyhedra and the Artistic Imagination in the Renaissance. Squeeze Press.
