= Pasquale Joseph Federico =

Pasquale ("Pat") Joseph Federico (March 25, 1902 – January 2, 1982) was a lifelong mathematician and longtime high-ranking official of the United States Patent Office.

== Biography ==
He was born in Monessen, Pennsylvania. About 1910 the family moved to Cleveland, Ohio where he gained a bachelor's degree in physics at Case Institute of Technology in 1923. He then received his LL.B or law degree from Washington College of Law in 1932.

Federico entered the Patent Office in 1923 as a junior examiner in Division 43, and by 1935, he became the Assistant Chief of his division and then became the Division Chief in 1940. He was appointed to the Board of Appeals in 1947, became the Examiner-in-Chief there, and remained there until his retirement from the Office in 1977.

Federico was also a prolific author of articles dealing with intellectual property and was also instrumental in several major changes to how patents were issued and how intellectual property is treated, assisting Congress in preparing the Patent Act of 1952 along with co-author Judge Giles Sutherland Rich, in the 1940s to 1950s - in fact, according to Judge Rich, Federico was the man most responsible for getting the 1952 Patent Act through Congress and enacted into law.

Federico also served for many years as the Patent Office's unofficial historian and Editor in Chief of the Journal of the Patent and Trademark Office Society (JPTOS) from 1936 to 1942. Some of his most well-known contributions to the field of mathematics focused on the study of perfect squares and the writings of Descartes.

Federico is credited for providing the quotation said to underlie the scope of patentable subject matter under United States law when he testified before a House subcommittee in 1951 that "under section 101 a person may have invented a machine or manufacture, which may include anything under the sun that is made by man," so long as it satisfies the requirements of the patent statute. This testimony was later quoted by the United States Supreme Court when the Court held in 1980 that living organisms were proper subject matter for patents. Nevertheless, the Supreme Court has since ruled that US patent protection does not extend to "Laws of nature, natural phenomena, and abstract ideas."

Judge Giles S. Rich of the Federal Circuit made these eulogistic remarks about Federico in a JPTOS article published shortly after Pat's death:

Pat Federico was the ideal public servant. Politicians may come and politicians may go and in the process get most of the publicity in governmental affairs, but it is people like Pat who make government work. It was my privilege and greatly to my benefit to come to know Pat some thirty-four years ago, to have worked with him on a couple of lengthy legislative projects, and to have remained in touch with him throughout the rest of his fruitful life.

=== The Federico Award ===
The Patent and Trademark Office Society has given an annual award in his namesake, the Pasquale J. Federico Memorial Award, which is, according to the official website of the award, "intended to recognize outstanding contributions to the Patent and Trademark Systems of the United States of America". Previous award recipients include Stephen Kunin, Nicholas Godici, Paul Michel, Donald Banner, Charles E. Van Horn, Pauline Newman, C. Marshall Dann, Herbert Wamsley, Helen Wilson Nies, Mike Kirk, Tom Arnold, Howard T. Markey, Rene D. Tegtmeyer, Isaac Fleischmann, Anne Chasser, Raymond Chen, John Whealan, Mark Lemley, Bernard J. Knight, Teresa Stanek Rea, Randall Rader and Deborah Cohn.

== Bibliography ==
=== Mathematics ===
- 1925: Vector Differential Geometry of Curves, Published by George Washington University
- 1982: Descartes on polyhedra: a study of the De solidorum elementis. Edition: illustrated, Springer ISBN 0-387-90760-2, ISBN 978-0-387-90760-4

=== Patent Office ===
- April 1932: "The First Patent Act," Journal of the Patent Office Society 14:237-252
- 1935: "Statutory Disclaimers in Patent Law," Published by P. Pearlman
- April 1936: "Operation of the Patent Act of 1790," Journal of the Patent Office Society 18:237-251
- 1936: (with J. R. Nunn) "A Fragment of Texas History", Journal of the Patent Office Society 18:407-410
- 1936: "Outline of the History of the United States Patent Office", Journal of the Patent Office Society 18: 251
- 1949: "Treaties Between the United States and Other Countries Relating to Trademarks"
- 1957: "Distribution of Patents Issued to Corporations (1939-55): Study of the Subcommittee on Patents, Trademarks, and Copyrights of the Committee on the Judiciary, United States Senate, Eighty-fourth Congress, Second Session, Pursuant to S. Res. 167", United States Congress. Senate. Committee on the Judiciary. Subcommittee on Patents, Trademarks, and Copyrights, United States Patent Office, U. S. Government Printing Office
- 1957: "Opposition and Revocation Proceedings in Patent Cases: Study of the Subcommittee on Patents, Trademarks, and Copyrights of the Committee on the Judiciary, United States Senate, Eighty-fourth Congress, Second Session, Pursuant to S. Res. 167," United States Congress. Senate. Committee on the Judiciary. Subcommittee on Patents, Trademarks, and Copyrights, U. S. Government Printing Office
- 1958: "Renewal Fees and Other Patent Fees in Foreign Countries: Study of the Committee on the Judiciary, United States Senate, Eighty-fifth Congress, Second Session, Pursuant to S. Res. 236," United States Congress. Senate. Committee on the Judiciary. Subcommittee on Patents, Trademarks, and Copyrights, Published by U.S. Government Printing Office
