= Pentagon =

Shape with five sides

- A cyclic pentagon
- Edges and vertices: 5

In geometry, a pentagon (from Greek πέντε (pente) 'five' and γωνία (gonia) 'angle') is any five-sided polygon or 5-gon. The sum of the internal angles in a simple pentagon is 540°.

A pentagon may be simple or self-intersecting. A self-intersecting regular pentagon (or star pentagon) is called a pentagram.

== Regular pentagons ==
Regular pentagon
- A regular pentagon
- Type: Regular polygon
- Edges and vertices: 5
- Schläfli symbol: {5}
- Symmetry group: Dihedral (D_{5}), order 2×5
- Internal angle (degrees): 108°
- Properties: Convex, cyclic, equilateral, isogonal, isotoxal
- Dual polygon: Self

Side ($t$), circumradius ($R$), inscribed circle radius ($r$), height ($R + r$), width/diagonal ($\varphi t$)

A regular pentagon has Schläfli symbol {5} and interior angles of 108°. It also has five lines of reflectional symmetry, and rotational symmetry of order 5 (through 72°, 144°, 216° and 288°). The diagonals of a convex regular pentagon are in the golden ratio to its sides. Given its side length $t,$ its height $H$ (distance from one side to the opposite vertex), width $W$ (distance between two farthest separated points, which equals the diagonal length $D$) and circumradius $R$ are given by:

$$\begin{align}
H &= \frac{\sqrt{5+2\sqrt{5}}}{2}~t \approx 1.539~t, \\
W=
D &= \frac{1 + \sqrt5}{2}~t\approx 1.618~t, \\
W &= \sqrt{2-\frac{2}{\sqrt{5}}} \cdot H\approx 1.051~H, \\
R &= \sqrt{\frac{5+\sqrt{5}}{10}} t\approx 0.8507~t, \\
D &= R\ {\sqrt { \frac {5 + \sqrt{5}}{2}} } = 2R\cos 18^\circ = 2R\cos\frac{\pi}{10} \approx 1.902~R.
\end{align}$$

The area of a convex regular pentagon with side length $t$ is given by
$$\begin{align}
A &= \frac{{t^2 \sqrt {25 + 10\sqrt 5} }}{4} = \frac{5t^2 \tan 54^\circ}{4} \\
&= \frac{\sqrt{5(5 + 2\sqrt{5})} \;t^2}{4} = \frac{t^2 \sqrt{4 \varphi^5 + 3}}{4}
\approx 1.720~t^2
\end{align}$$

If the circumradius $R$ of a regular pentagon is given, its edge length $t$ is found by the expression
$$t = R\ {\sqrt { \frac {5 - \sqrt{5}}{2}} } = 2R\sin 36^\circ = 2R\sin\frac{\pi}{5} \approx 1.176~R,$$
and its area is
$$A = \frac{5R^2}{4}\sqrt{\frac{5 + \sqrt{5}}{2}};$$
since the area of the circumscribed circle is $\pi R^2,$ the regular pentagon fills approximately 0.7568 of its circumscribed circle.

=== Derivation of the area formula ===
The area of any regular polygon is:
$$A = \frac{1}{2}Pr$$
where P is the perimeter of the polygon, and r is the inradius (equivalently the apothem). Substituting the regular pentagon's values for P and r gives the formula
$$A = \frac{1}{2} \cdot 5t \cdot \frac{t\tan\mathord\left(\frac{3 \pi}{10}\right)}{2} = \frac{5t^2\tan\mathord\left(\frac{3 \pi}{10}\right)}{4}$$
with side length t.

=== Inradius ===
Similar to every regular convex polygon, the regular convex pentagon has an inscribed circle. The apothem, which is the radius r of the inscribed circle, of a regular pentagon is related to the side length t by
$$r = \frac{t}{2\tan\mathord\left(\frac{\pi}{5}\right)} = \frac{t}{2\sqrt{5 - \sqrt{20}}} \approx 0.6882 \cdot t.$$

=== Chords from the circumscribed circle to the vertices ===
Like every regular convex polygon, the regular convex pentagon has a circumscribed circle. For a regular pentagon with successive vertices A, B, C, D, E, if P is any point on the circumcircle between points B and C, then PA + PD = PB + PC + PE.

=== Point in plane ===
For an arbitrary point in the plane of a regular pentagon with circumradius $R$, whose distances to the centroid of the regular pentagon and its five vertices are $L$ and $d_i$ respectively, we have
$$\begin{align}
\textstyle \sum_{i=1}^5 d_i^2 &= 5\left(R^2 + L^2\right), \\
\textstyle \sum_{i=1}^5 d_i^4 &= 5\left(\left(R^2 + L^2\right)^2 + 2R^2 L^2\right), \\
\textstyle \sum_{i=1}^5 d_i^6 &= 5\left(\left(R^2 + L^2\right)^3 + 6R^2 L^2 \left(R^2 + L^2\right)\right), \\
\textstyle \sum_{i=1}^5 d_i^8 &= 5\left(\left(R^2 + L^2\right)^4 + 12R^2 L^2 \left(R^2 + L^2\right)^2 + 6R^4 L^4\right).
\end{align}$$

If $d_i$ are the distances from the vertices of a regular pentagon to any point on its circumcircle, then
$$3\left(\textstyle \sum_{i=1}^5 d_i^2\right)^2 = 10 \textstyle \sum_{i=1}^5 d_i^4 .$$

=== Geometrical constructions ===
The regular pentagon is constructible with compass and straightedge, as 5 is a Fermat prime. A variety of methods are known for constructing a regular pentagon. Some are discussed below.

==== Richmond's method ====
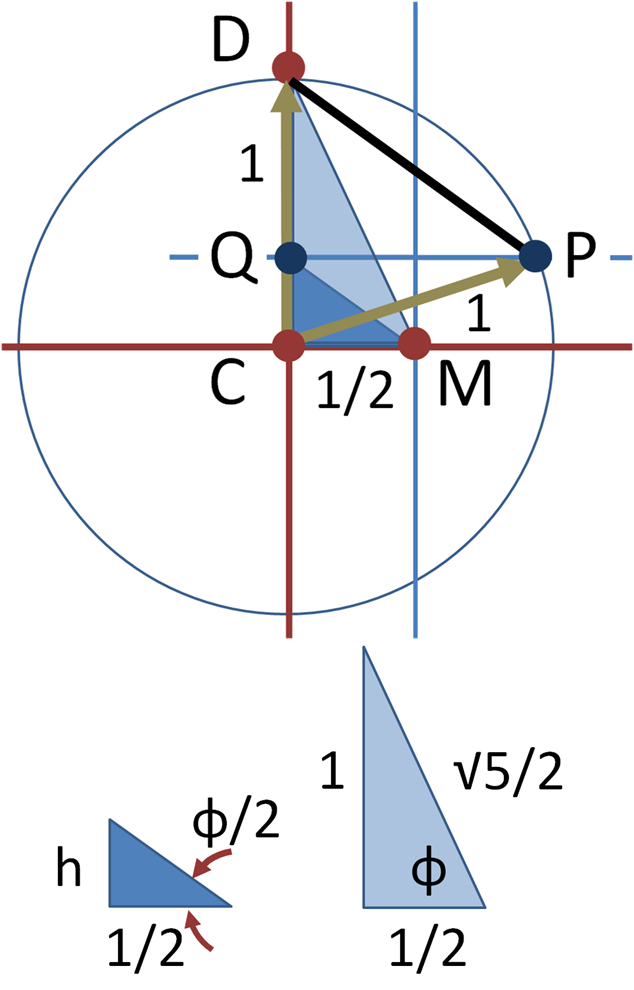

One method to construct a regular pentagon in a given circle is described by Richmond and further discussed in Cromwell's Polyhedra.

The top panel shows the construction used in Richmond's method to create the side of the inscribed pentagon. The circle defining the pentagon has unit radius. Its center is located at point C and a midpoint M is marked halfway along its radius. This point is joined to the periphery vertically above the center at point D. Angle CMD is bisected, and the bisector intersects the vertical axis at point Q. A horizontal line through Q intersects the circle at point P, and chord PD is the required side of the inscribed pentagon.

To determine the length of this side, the two right triangles DCM and QCM are depicted below the circle. Using Pythagoras' theorem and two sides, the hypotenuse of the larger triangle is found as $\scriptstyle \sqrt{5}/2$. Side h of the smaller triangle then is found using the half-angle formula:
$$\tan(\phi/2) = \frac{1 - \cos(\phi)}{\sin(\phi)} \ ,$$
where cosine and sine of ϕ are known from the larger triangle. The result is:
$$h = \frac{\sqrt 5 - 1}{4} \ .$$

If DP is truly the side of a regular pentagon, $m \angle\mathrm{CDP} = 54^\circ$, so DP = 2 cos(54°), QD = DP cos(54°) = 2cos^{2}(54°), and CQ = 1 − 2cos^{2}(54°), which equals −cos(108°) by the cosine double angle formula. This is the cosine of 72°, which equals $\left(\sqrt 5 - 1\right)/4$ as desired.

==== Carlyle circles ====
Method using Carlyle circles

The Carlyle circle was invented as a geometric method to find the roots of a quadratic equation. This methodology leads to a procedure for constructing a regular pentagon. The steps are as follows:

1. Draw a circle in which to inscribe the pentagon and mark the center point O.
2. Draw a horizontal line through the center of the circle. Mark the left intersection with the circle as point B.
3. Construct a vertical line through the center. Mark one intersection with the circle as point A.
4. Construct the point M as the midpoint of O and B.
5. Draw a circle centered at M through the point A. Mark its intersection with the horizontal line (inside the original circle) as the point W and its intersection outside the circle as the point V.
6. Draw a circle of radius OA and center W. It intersects the original circle at two of the vertices of the pentagon.
7. Draw a circle of radius OA and center V. It intersects the original circle at two of the vertices of the pentagon.
8. The fifth vertex is the rightmost intersection of the horizontal line with the original circle.

Steps 6–8 are equivalent to the following version, shown in the animation:

6a. Construct point F as the midpoint of O and W.

7a. Construct a vertical line through F. It intersects the original circle at two of the vertices of the pentagon. The third vertex is the rightmost intersection of the horizontal line with the original circle.

8a. Construct the other two vertices using the compass and the length of the vertex found in step 7a.

==== Using trigonometry ====
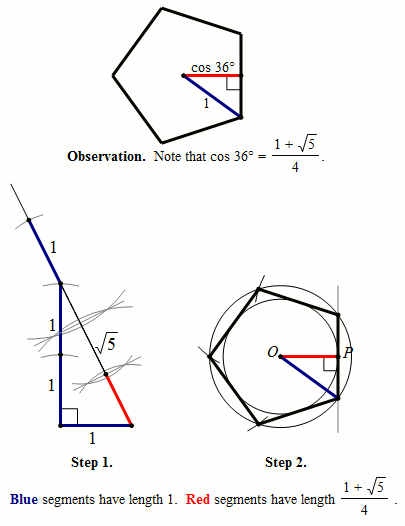
Method using trigonometry

Since $\cos(36^\circ) = \frac{1+\sqrt 5}{4}$, we can construct a regular pentagon by constructing a specific right triangle and duplicating it, as follows:

- We first note that a regular pentagon can be divided into 10 congruent triangles as shown in the Observation.
- In Step 1, we use four units (shown in blue) and a right angle to construct a segment of length $1+\sqrt 5$ – specifically by creating a $1-2-\sqrt 5$ right triangle and then extending the hypotenuse of $\sqrt 5$ by a length of 1. We then bisect that segment – and then bisect again – to create a segment of length $\frac{1+\sqrt 5}{4}$ (shown in red.)
- In Step 2, we construct two concentric circles centered at $O$ with radii of length 1 and length $\frac{1+\sqrt 5}{4}$. We then place $P$ arbitrarily on the smaller circle, as shown. Constructing a line perpendicular to $\overline{OP}$ passing through $P$, we construct a side of the appropriate length by using the points created at the intersection of the tangent and the unit circle. Copying that length four times results in a regular pentagon.

==== Euclid's method ====
Euclid's method for pentagon at a given circle, using the golden triangle, animation 1 min 39 s

A regular pentagon is constructible using a compass and straightedge, either by inscribing one in a given circle or constructing one on a given edge. This process was described by Euclid in his Elements circa 300 BC.

=== Physical construction methods ===
Overhand knot of a paper strip

- A regular pentagon may be created from just a strip of paper by tying an overhand knot into the strip and carefully flattening the knot by pulling the ends of the paper strip. Folding one of the ends back over the pentagon will reveal a pentagram when backlit.
- Construct a regular hexagon on stiff paper or card. Crease along the three diameters between opposite vertices. Cut from one vertex to the center to make an equilateral triangular flap. Fix this flap underneath its neighbor to make a pentagonal pyramid. The base of the pyramid is a regular pentagon.

=== Symmetry ===
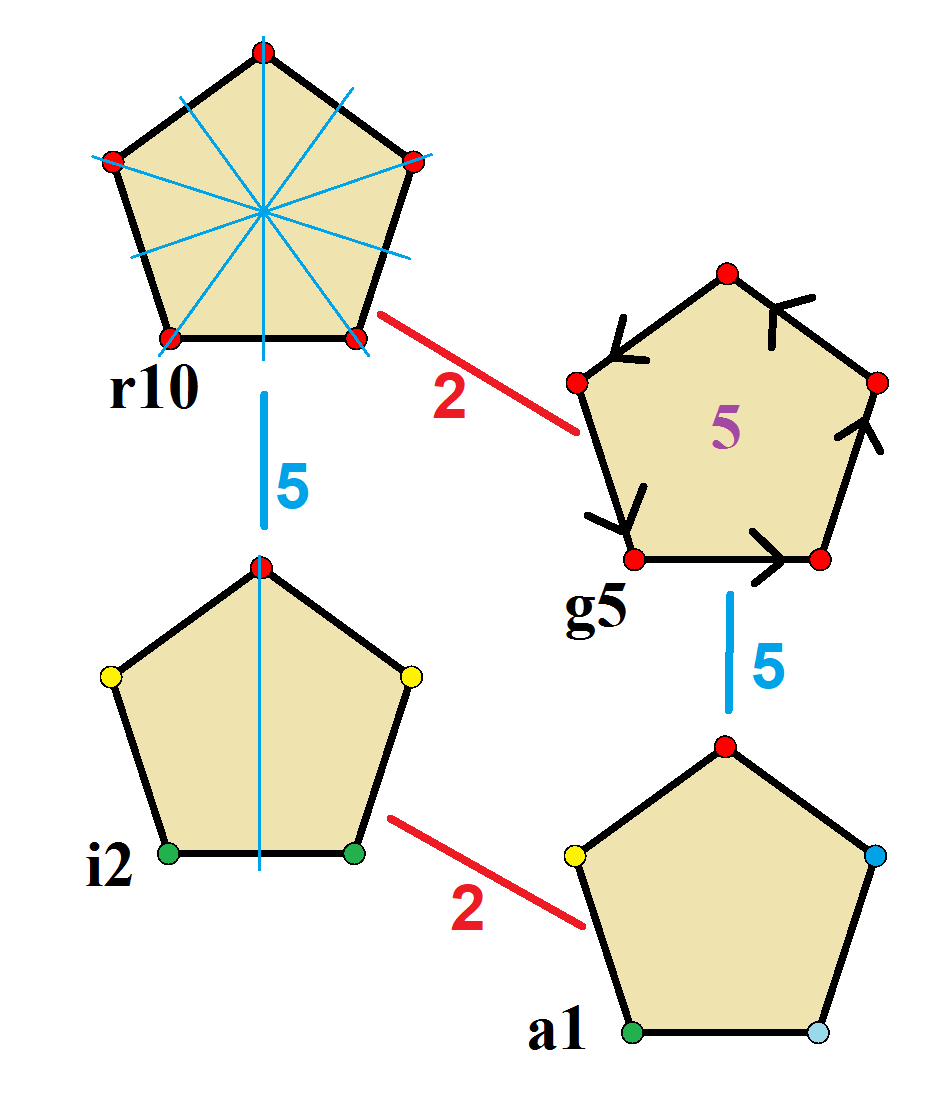
Symmetries of a regular pentagon. Vertices are colored by their symmetry positions. Blue mirror lines are drawn through vertices and edges. Gyration orders are given in the center.

The regular pentagon has Dih_{5} symmetry, order 10. Since 5 is a prime number, there is one subgroup with dihedral symmetry: Dih_{1}, and 2 cyclic group symmetries: Z_{5}, and Z_{1}.

These 4 symmetries can be seen in 4 distinct symmetries on the pentagon. John Conway labels these by a letter and group order. Full symmetry of the regular form is r10 and no symmetry is labeled a1. The dihedral symmetries are divided depending on whether they pass through vertices (d for diagonal) or edges (p for perpendiculars), and i when reflection lines path through both edges and vertices. Cyclic symmetries in the middle column are labeled as g for their central gyration orders.

Each subgroup symmetry allows one or more degrees of freedom for irregular forms. Only the g5 subgroup has no degrees of freedom but can be seen as directed edges.

=== Regular pentagram ===
A pentagram or pentangle is a regular star pentagon. Its Schläfli symbol is {5/2}. Its sides form the diagonals of a regular convex pentagon – in this arrangement the sides of the two pentagons are in the golden ratio.

== Equilateral pentagons ==
Equilateral pentagon built with four equal circles disposed in a chain.

An equilateral pentagon is a polygon with five sides of equal length. However, its five internal angles can take a range of sets of values, thus permitting it to form a family of pentagons. In contrast, the regular pentagon is unique up to similarity, because it is equilateral and it is equiangular (its five angles are equal).

== Cyclic pentagons ==
A cyclic pentagon is one for which a circle called the circumcircle goes through all five vertices. The regular pentagon is an example of a cyclic pentagon. The area of a cyclic pentagon, whether regular or not, can be expressed as one fourth the square root of one of the roots of a septic equation whose coefficients are functions of the sides of the pentagon.

There exist cyclic pentagons with rational sides and rational area; these are called Robbins pentagons. It has been proved that the diagonals of a Robbins pentagon must be either all rational or all irrational, and it is conjectured that all the diagonals must be rational. See also Cyclic polygon § Integer area and side lengths.

== General convex pentagons ==
For all convex pentagons with sides $a, b, c, d, e$ and diagonals $d_1, d_2, d_3, d_4, d_5$, the following inequality holds:
$$3(a^2+b^2+c^2+d^2+e^2) > d_1^2+d_2^2+d_3^2+d_4^2+d_5^2.$$

== Pentagons in tiling ==
The best-known packing of equal-sized regular pentagons on a plane is a double lattice structure which covers 92.131% of the plane.

A regular pentagon cannot appear in any tiling of regular polygons. First, to prove a pentagon cannot form a regular tiling (one in which all faces are congruent, thus requiring that all the polygons be pentagons), observe that 360° / 108° = 3 1/3 (where 108° Is the interior angle), which is not a whole number; hence there exists no integer number of pentagons sharing a single vertex and leaving no gaps between them. More difficult is proving a pentagon cannot be in any edge-to-edge tiling made by regular polygons:

The maximum known packing density of a regular pentagon is $(5-\sqrt 5)/3\approx 0.921$, achieved by the double lattice packing shown. In a preprint released in 2016, Thomas Hales and Wöden Kusner announced a proof that this double lattice packing of the regular pentagon (known as the "pentagonal ice-ray" Chinese lattice design, dating from around 1900) has the optimal density among all packings of regular pentagons in the plane.

There are no combinations of regular polygons with 4 or more meeting at a vertex that contain a pentagon. For combinations with 3, if 3 polygons meet at a vertex and one has an odd number of sides, the other 2 must be congruent. The reason for this is that the polygons that touch the edges of the pentagon must alternate around the pentagon, which is impossible because of the pentagon's odd number of sides. For the pentagon, this results in a polygon whose angles are all (360 − 108) / 2 = 126°. To find the number of sides this polygon has, the result is 360 / (180 − 126) = 6 2/3, which is not a whole number. Therefore, a pentagon cannot appear in any tiling made by regular polygons.

There are 15 classes of pentagons that can monohedrally tile the plane. None of the pentagons have any symmetry in general, although some have special cases with mirror symmetry.

15 monohedral pentagonal tiles
| 1 | 2 | 3 | 4 | 5 |
| 6 | 7 | 8 | 9 | 10 |
| 11 | 12 | 13 | 14 | 15 |

== Pentagons in polyhedra ==
| I_{h} | T_{h} | T_{d} | O | I | D_{5d} |
|---|---|---|---|---|---|
| Dodecahedron | Pyritohedron | Tetartoid | Pentagonal icositetrahedron | Pentagonal hexecontahedron | Truncated trapezohedron |

== Pentagons in nature ==
=== Plants ===
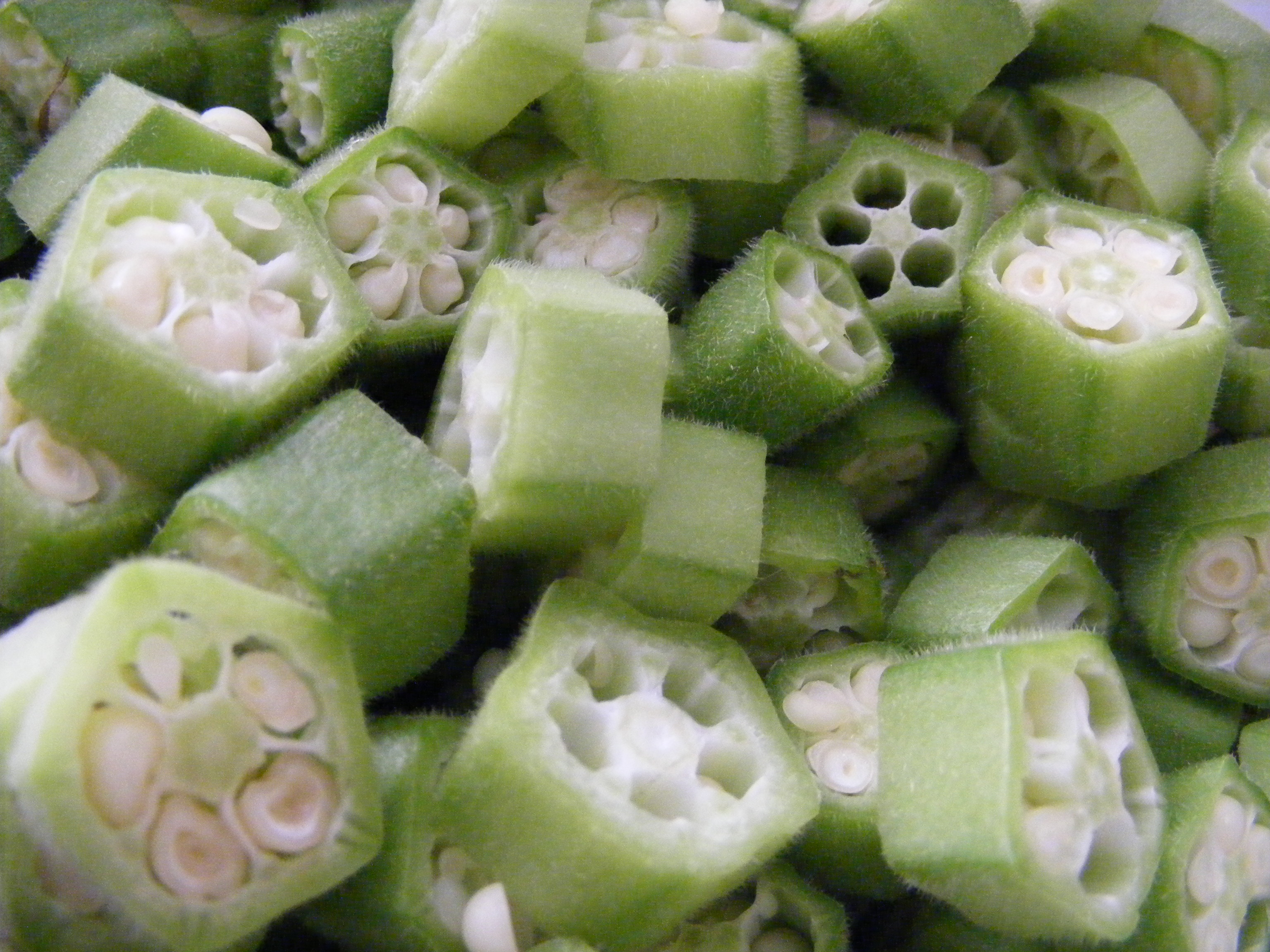
Pentagonal cross-section of okra.

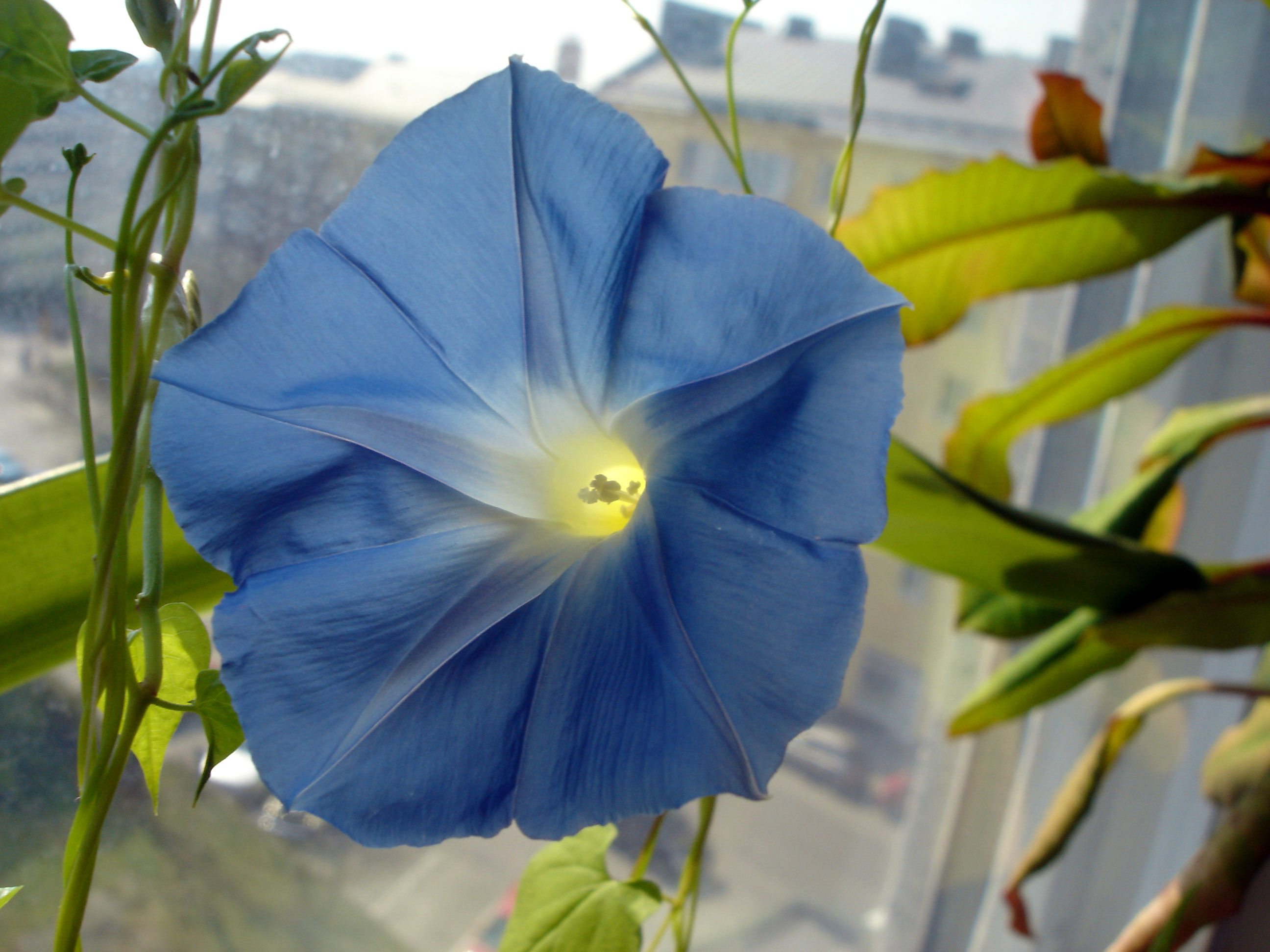
Morning glories, like many other flowers, have a pentagonal shape.

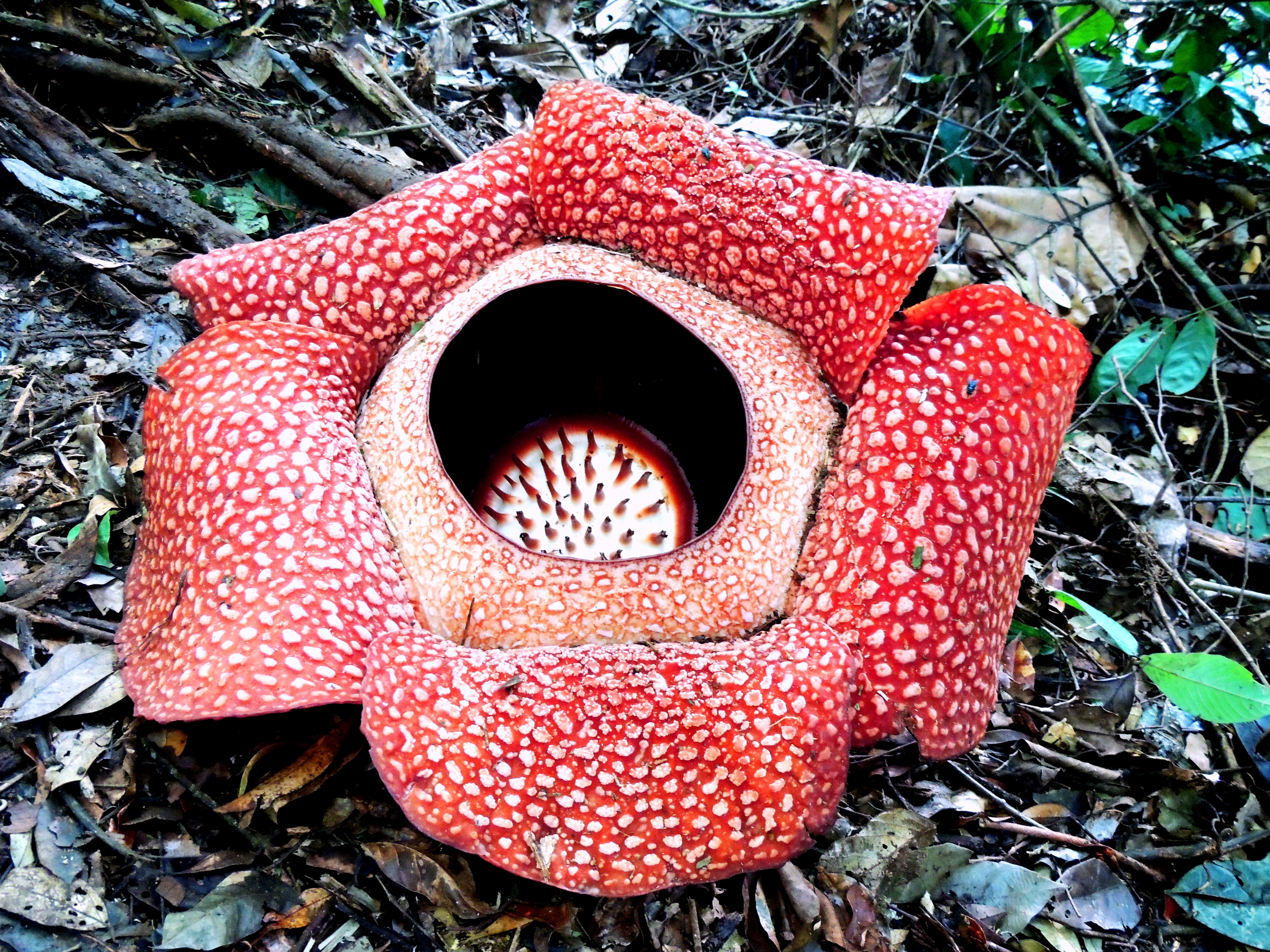
Perigone tube of Rafflesia flower.

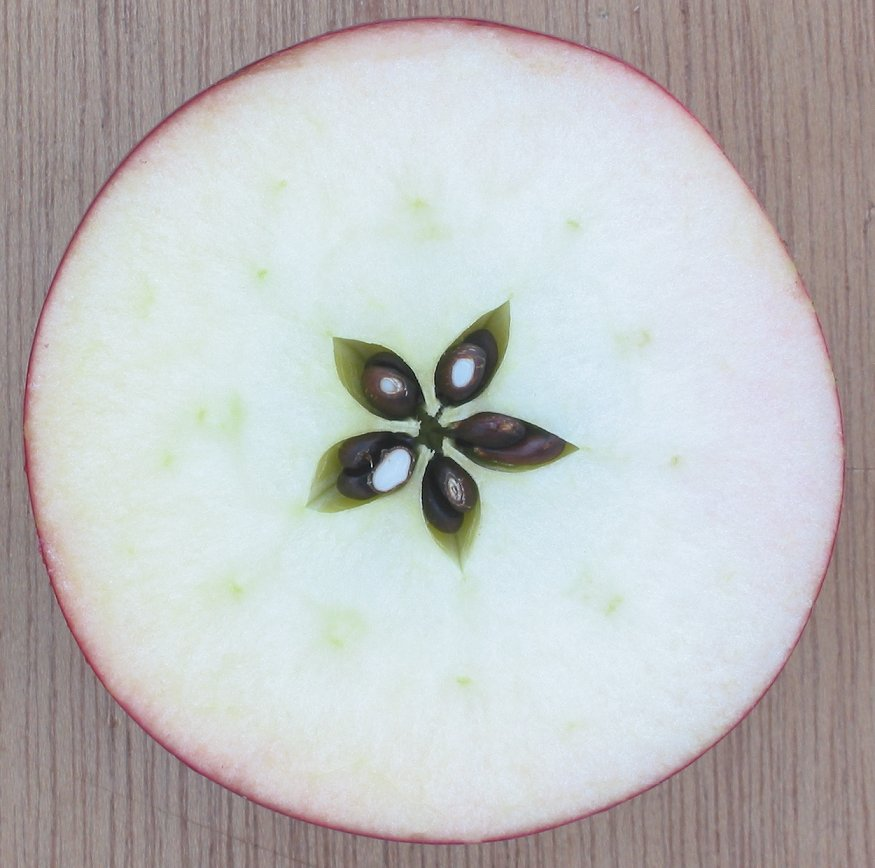
The gynoecium of an apple contains five carpels, arranged in a five-pointed star

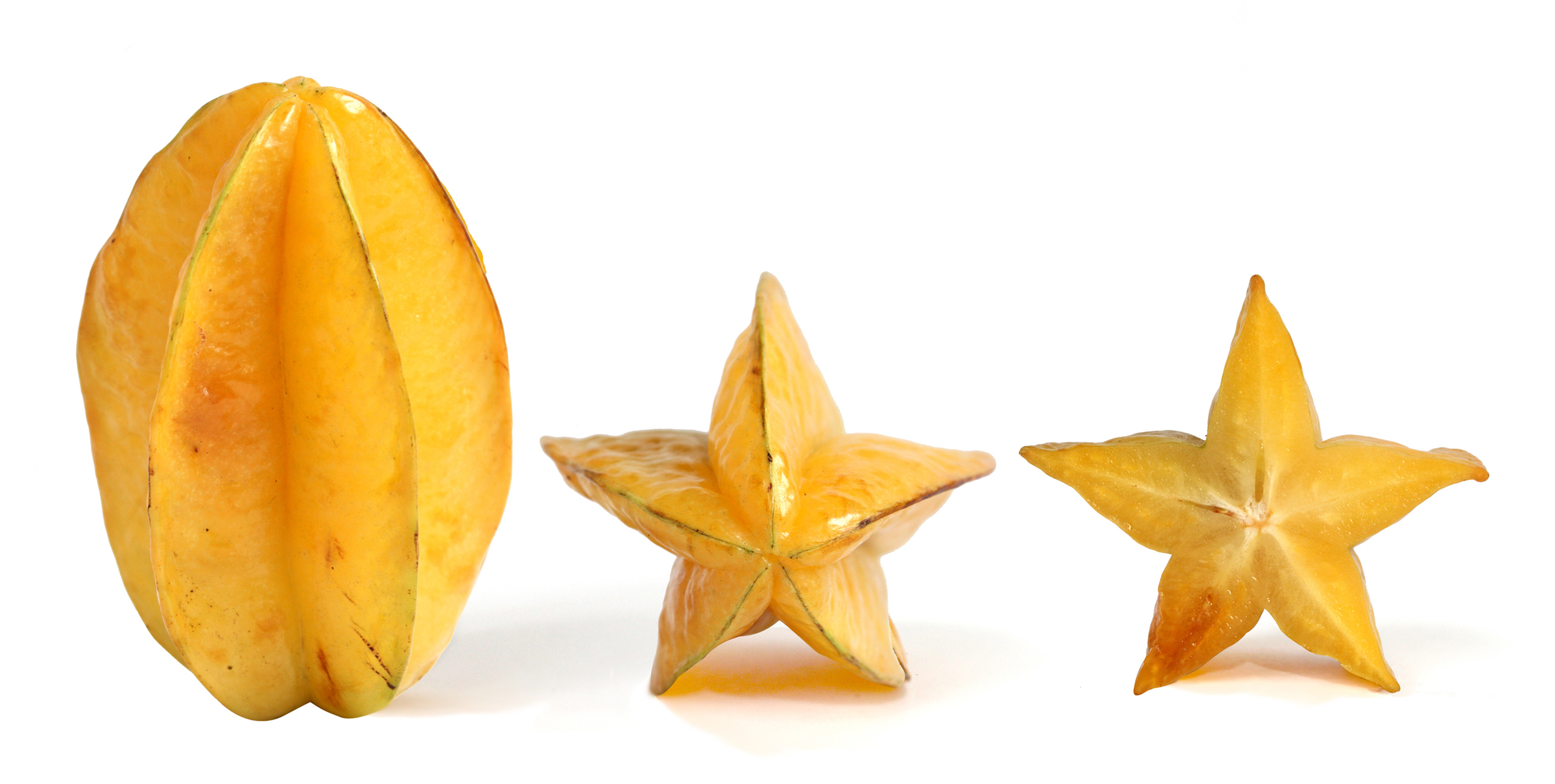
Starfruit is another fruit with fivefold symmetry.

=== Animals ===
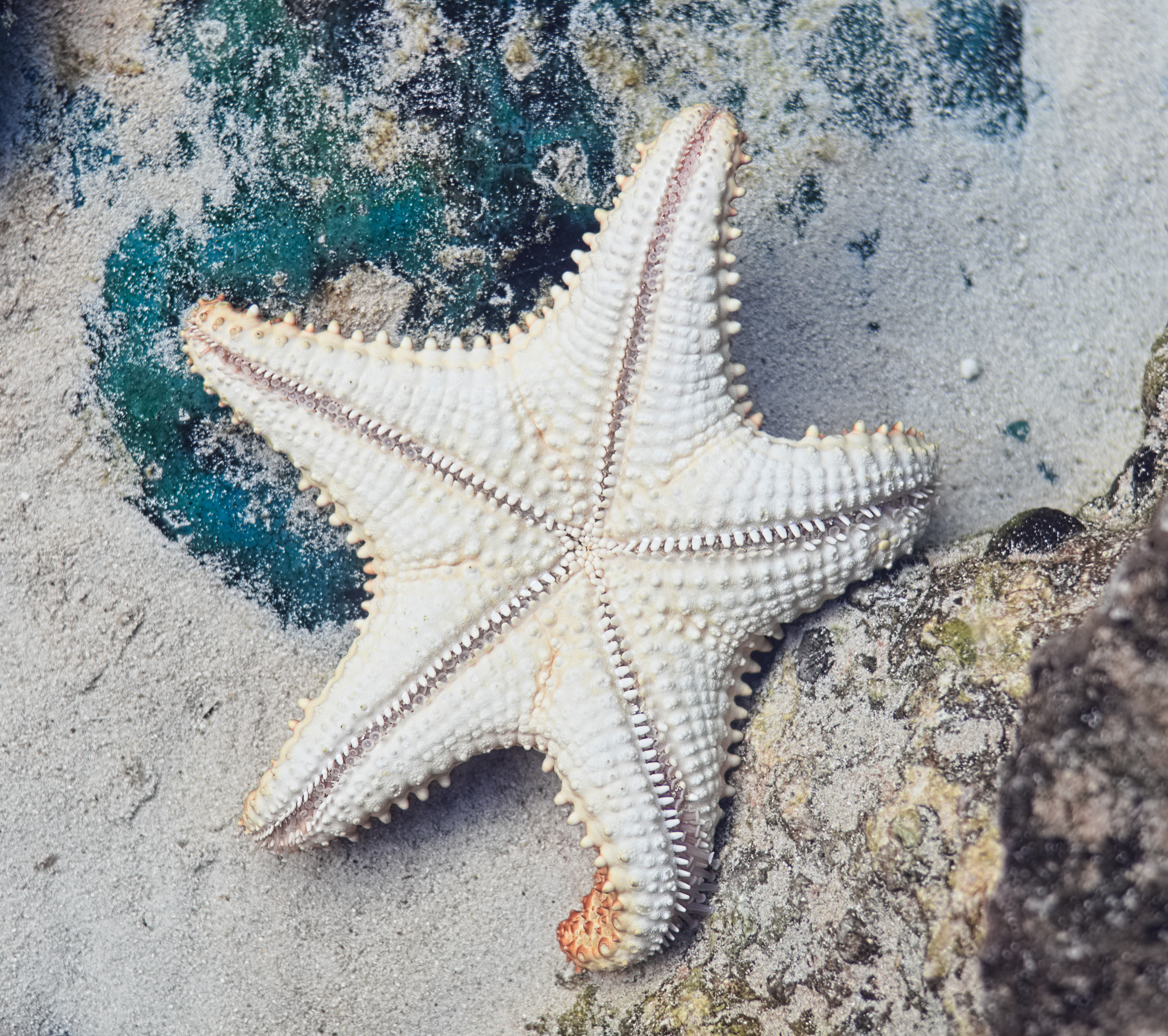
A sea star. Many echinoderms have fivefold radial symmetry.

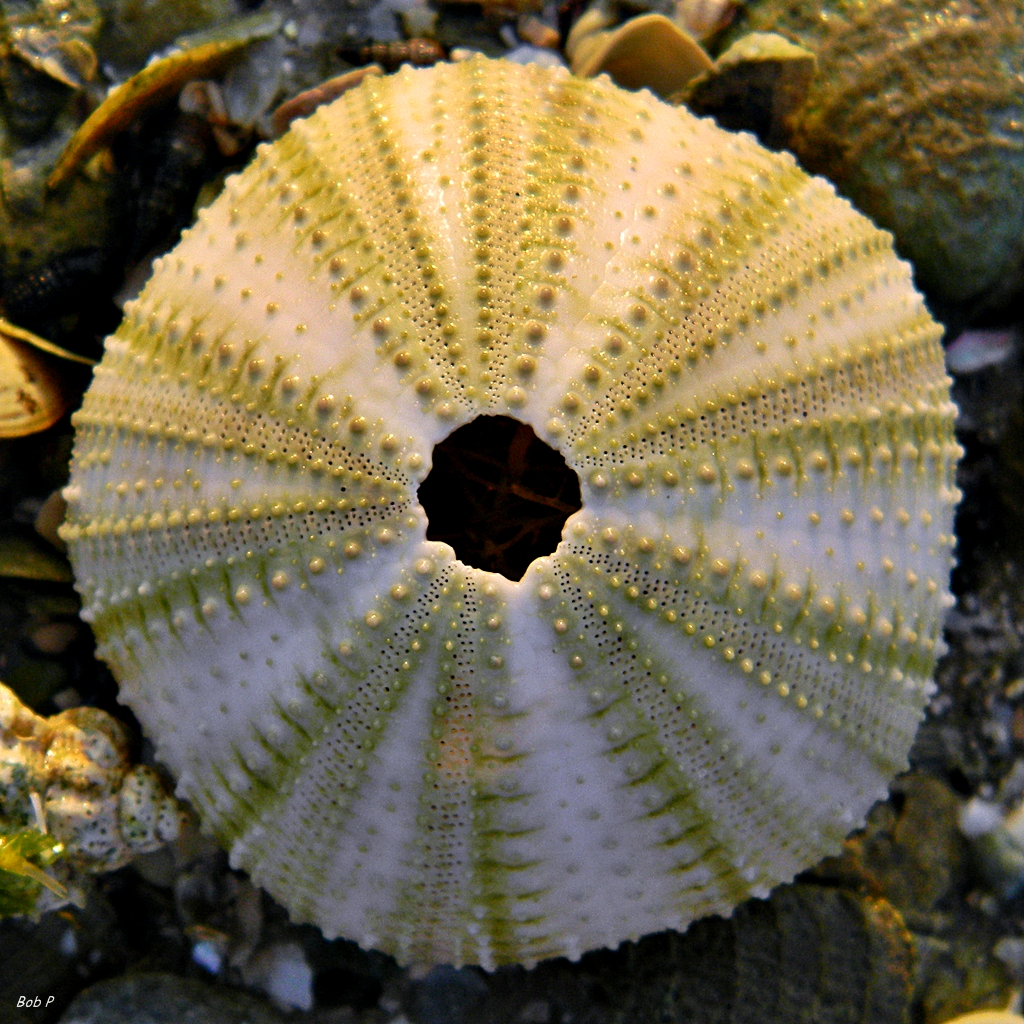
Another example of echinoderm, a sea urchin endoskeleton.

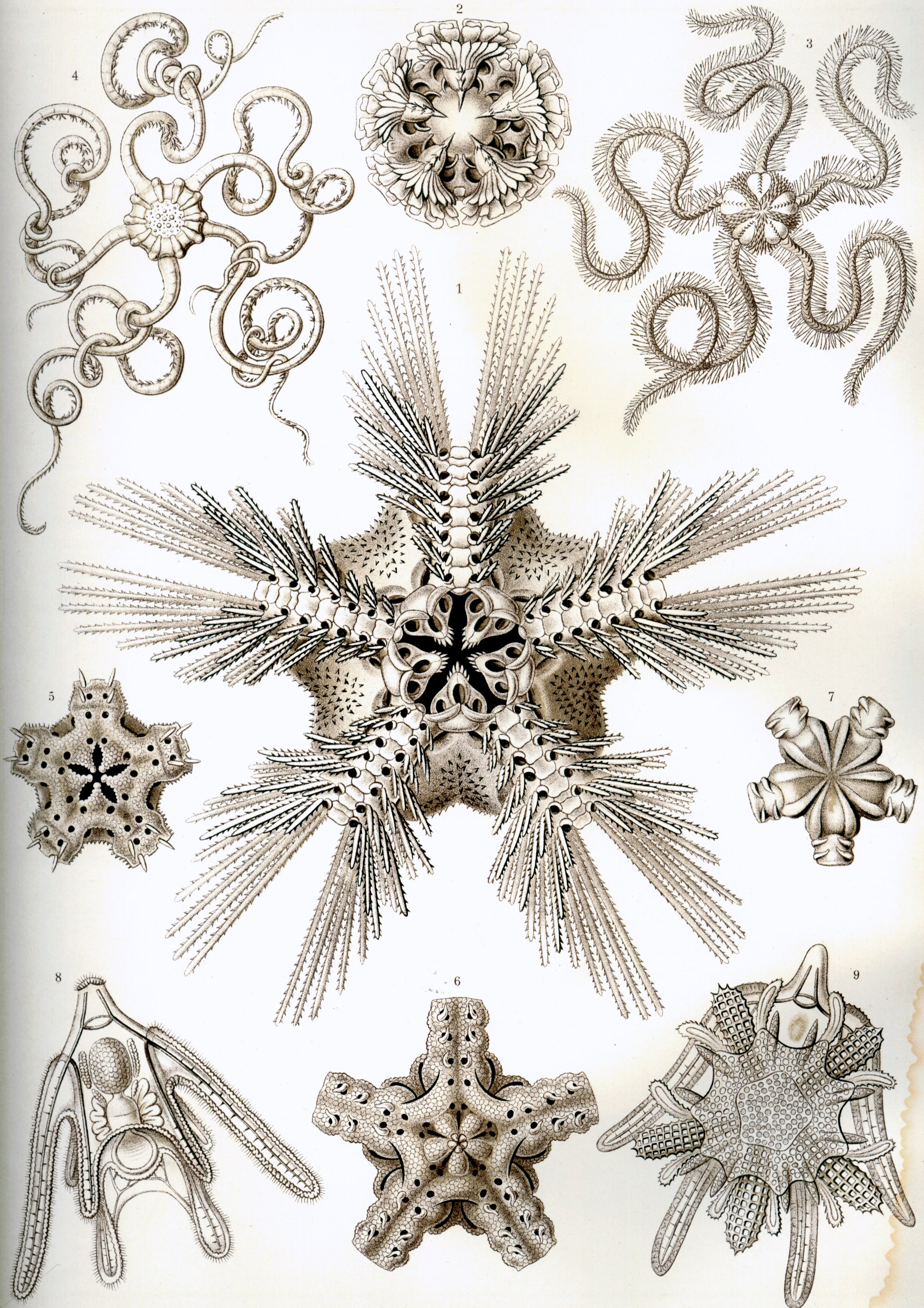
An illustration of brittle stars, also echinoderms with a pentagonal shape.

=== Minerals ===
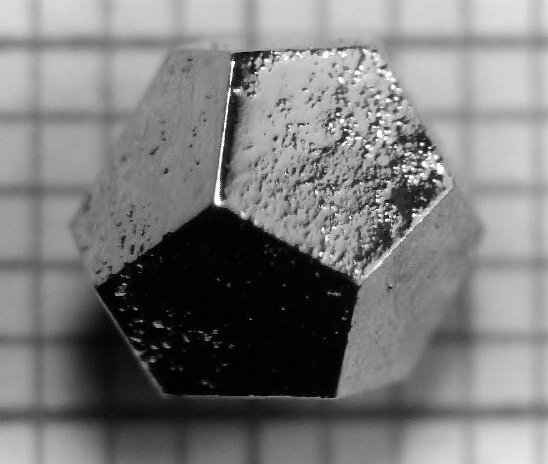
A Ho-Mg-Zn icosahedral quasicrystal formed as a pentagonal dodecahedron. The faces are true regular pentagons.

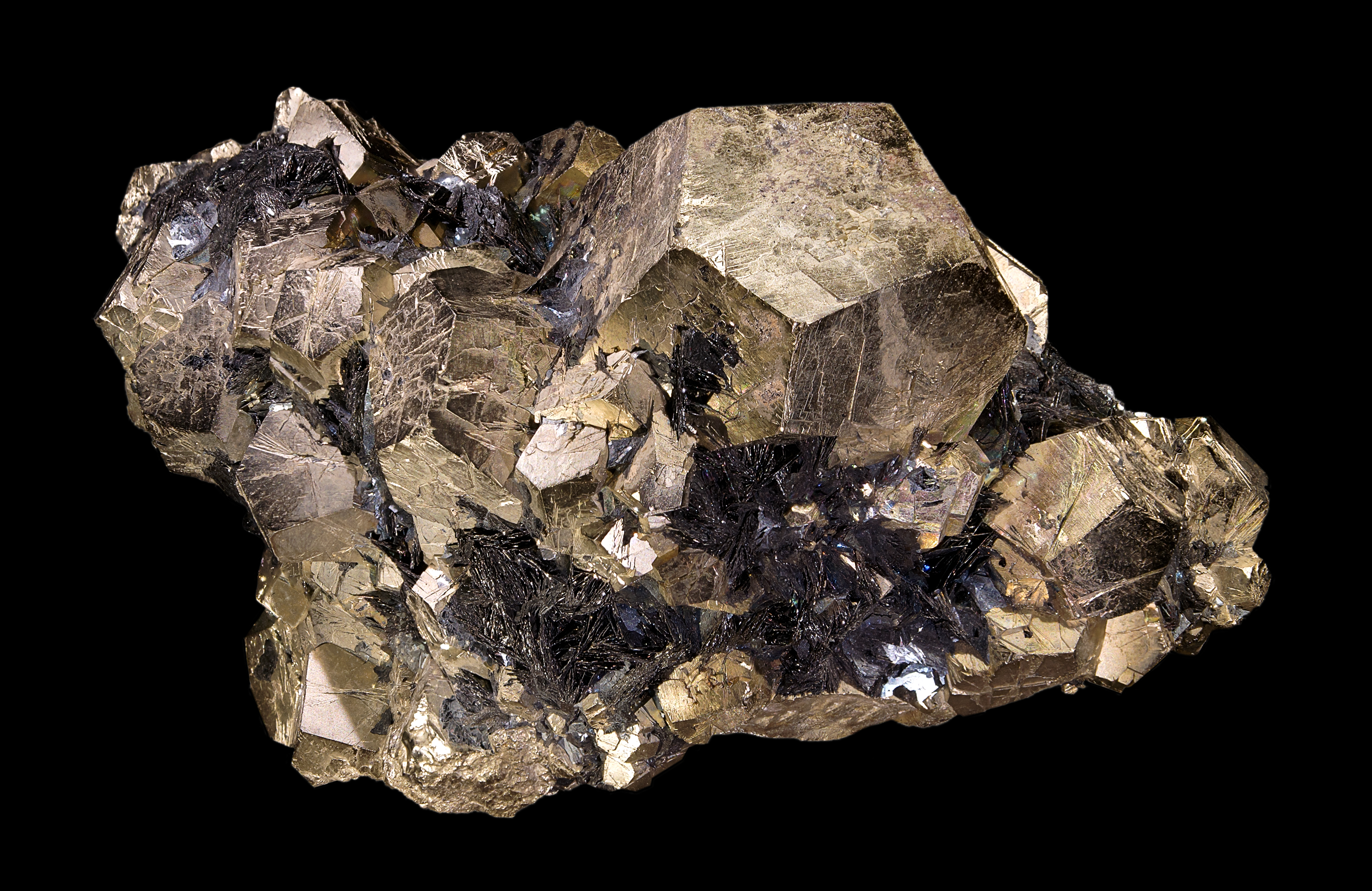
A pyritohedral crystal of pyrite. A pyritohedron has 12 identical pentagonal faces that are not constrained to be regular.

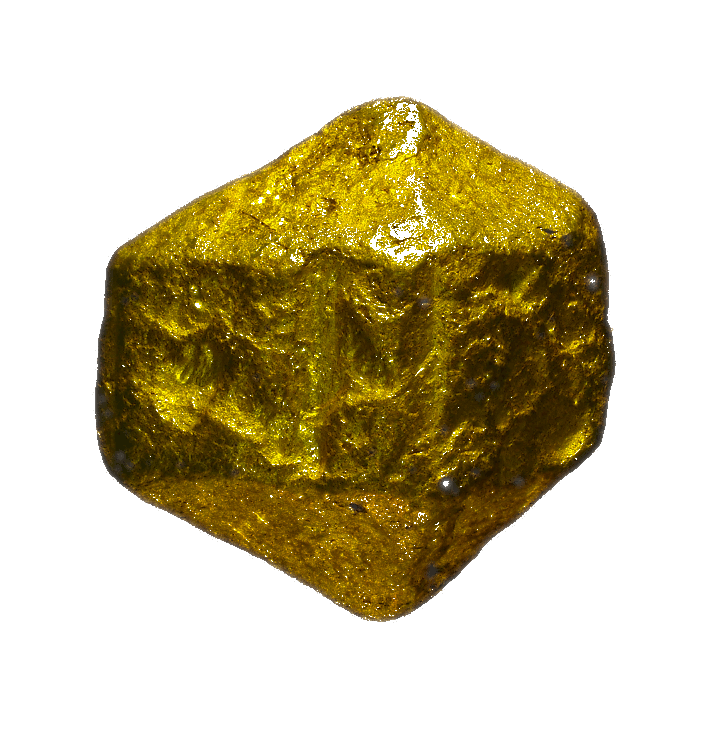
A Fiveling of gold, half a centimeter tall.

== Other examples ==
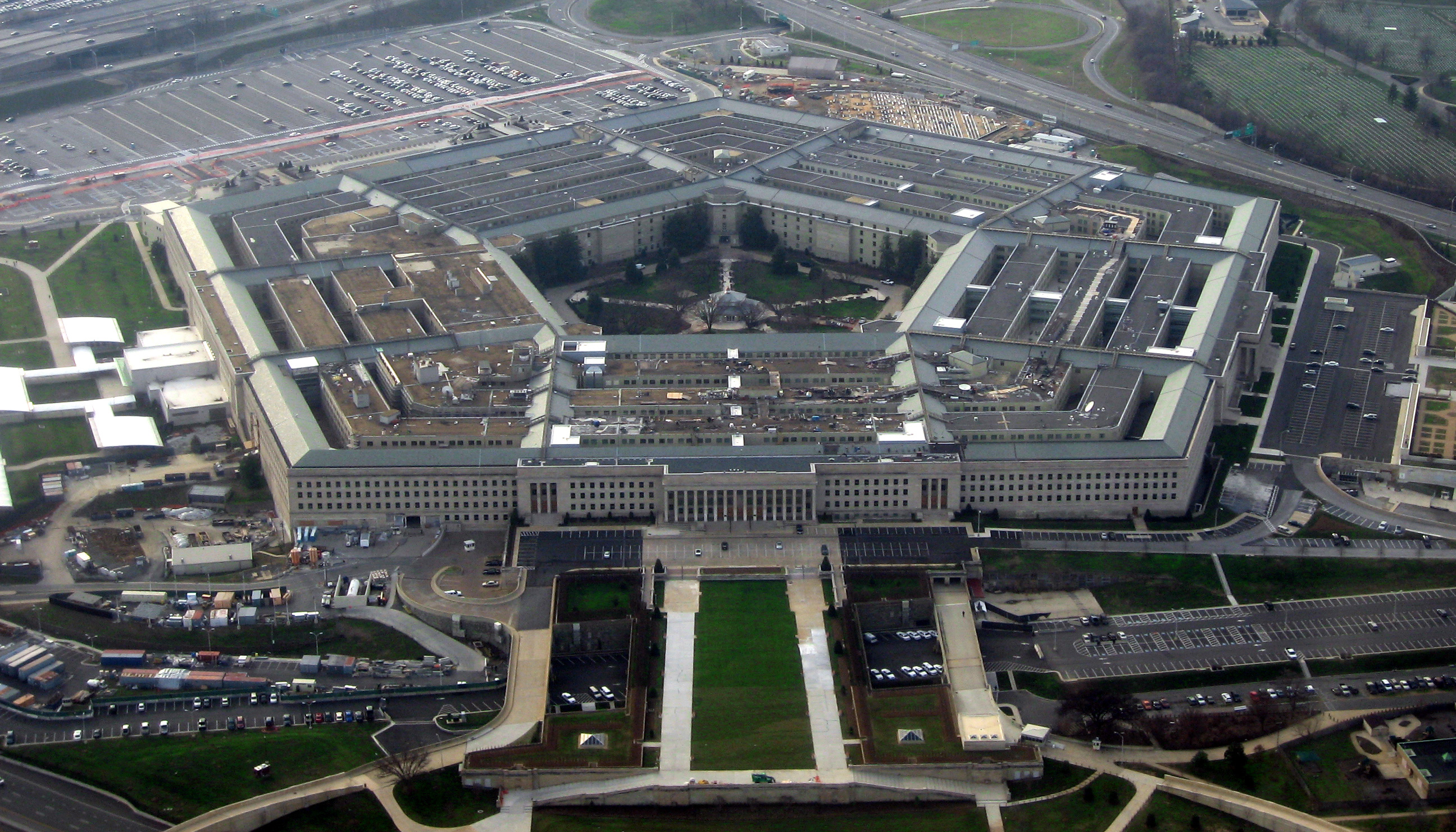
The Pentagon, headquarters of the United States Department of Defense.

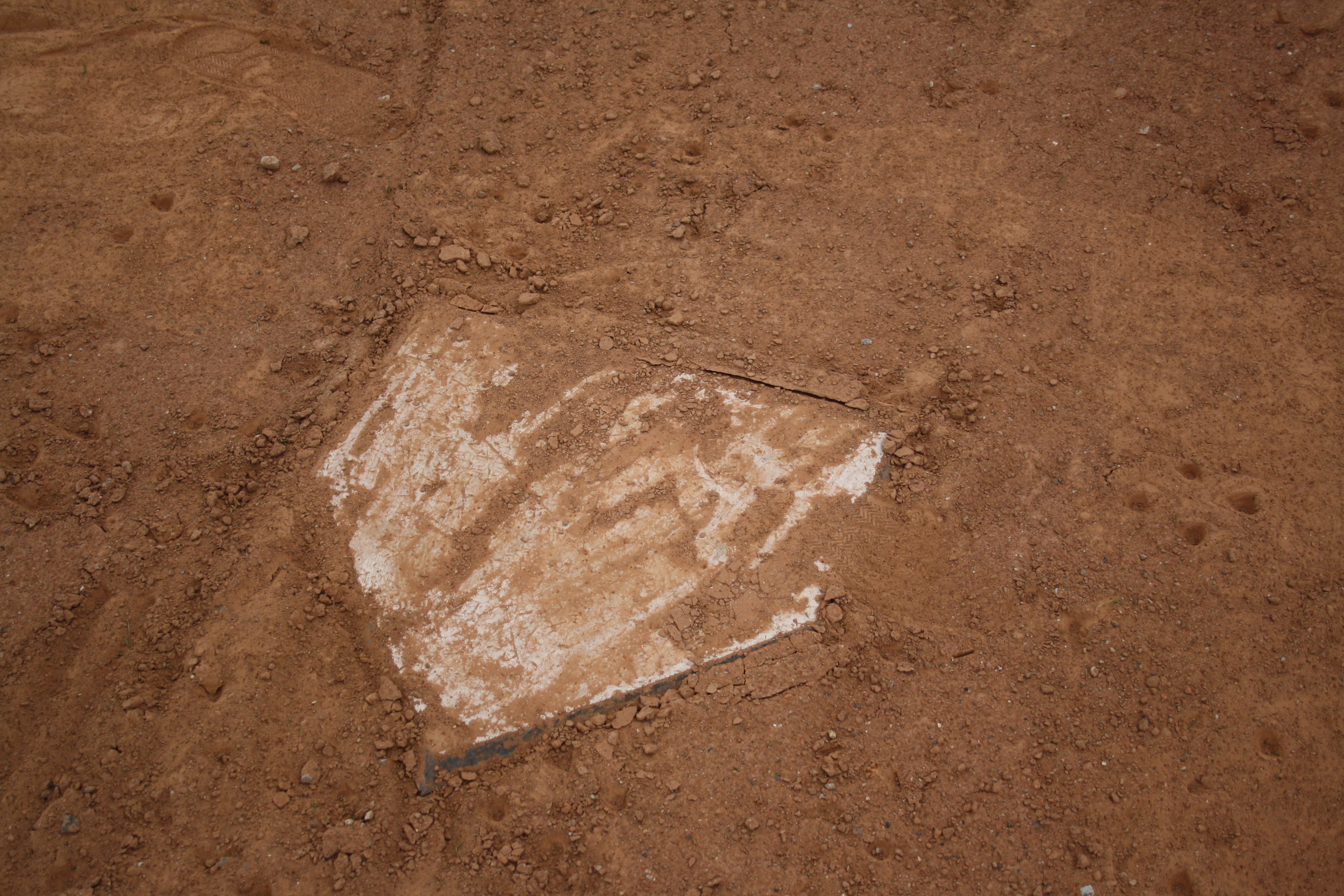
Home plate of a baseball field

== See also ==
- Associahedron; A pentagon is an order-4 associahedron
- Dodecahedron, a polyhedron whose regular form is composed of 12 pentagonal faces
- Golden ratio
- List of geometric shapes
- Pentagonal numbers
- Pentagram
- Pentagram map
- Pentastar, the Chrysler logo
- Pythagoras' theorem
- Trigonometric constants for a pentagon

== In-line notes and references ==
Fundamental convex regular and uniform polytopes
| Family | A_{n} | B_{n} | I_{2}(p) / D_{n} | E_{6} / E_{7} / E_{8} / F_{4} / G_{2} | H_{n} |
| Regular polygon | Triangle | Square | p-gon | Hexagon | Pentagon |
| Uniform polyhedron | Tetrahedron | Octahedron • Cube | Demicube | | Dodecahedron • Icosahedron |
| Uniform polychoron | Pentachoron | 16-cell • Tesseract | Demitesseract | 24-cell | 120-cell • 600-cell |
| Uniform 5-polytope | 5-simplex | 5-orthoplex • 5-cube | 5-demicube | | |
| Uniform 6-polytope | 6-simplex | 6-orthoplex • 6-cube | 6-demicube | 1_{22} • 2_{21} | |
| Uniform 7-polytope | 7-simplex | 7-orthoplex • 7-cube | 7-demicube | 1_{32} • 2_{31} • 3_{21} | |
| Uniform 8-polytope | 8-simplex | 8-orthoplex • 8-cube | 8-demicube | 1_{42} • 2_{41} • 4_{21} | |
| Uniform n-polytope | n-simplex | n-orthoplex • n-cube | n-demicube | 1_{k2} • 2_{k1} • k_{21} | n-pentagonal polytope |
Topics: Polytope families • Regular polytope • List of regular polytopes and compounds • Polytope operations
