= Regular Figures =

1964 mathematics text

- Cover of Pergamon edition
- Author: László Fejes Tóth
- Language: English
- Series: International Series of Monographs in Pure and Applied Mathematics
- Genre: Mathematics
- Publisher: Pergamon Press, Macmillan Inc.
- Publication date: 1964
- ISBN: 9781483119014

Regular Figures is a book on polyhedra and symmetric patterns, by Hungarian geometer László Fejes Tóth. It was published in 1964 by Pergamon in London and Macmillan in New York.

== Topics ==
Regular Figures is divided into two parts, "Systematology of the Regular Figures" and "Genetics of the Regular Figures", each in five chapters. Although the first part represents older and standard material, much of the second part is based on a large collection of research works by Fejes Tóth, published over the course of approximately 25 years, and on his previous exposition of this material in a 1953 German-language text.

The first part of the book covers many of the same topics as a previously published book, Regular Polytopes (1947), by H. S. M. Coxeter, but with a greater emphasis on group theory and the classification of symmetry groups. Its first three chapters describe the symmetries that two-dimensional geometric objects can have: the 17 wallpaper groups of the Euclidean plane in the first chapter, with the first English-language presentation of the proof of their classification by Evgraf Fedorov, the regular spherical tilings in chapter two, and the uniform tilings of the hyperbolic plane in chapter three. Also mentioned is the Voderberg tiling by non-convex enneagons, as an example of a systematically constructed tiling that lacks all symmetry (prefiguring the discovery of aperiodic tilings). The fourth chapter describes symmetric polyhedra, including the five Platonic solids, the 13 Archimedean solids, and the five parallelohedra also enumerated by Federov, which come from the discrete translational symmetries of Euclidean space. The fifth and final chapter of this section of the book extends this investigation into higher dimensions and the regular polytopes.

The second part of the book concerns the principle that many of these symmetric patterns and shapes can be generated as the solutions to optimization problems, such as the Tammes problem of arranging a given number of points on a sphere so as to maximize the minimum distance between pairs of points. Isometric inequalities for polyhedra and problems of packing density and covering density of sphere packings and coverings are also included, and the proofs make frequent use of Jensen's inequality. This part is organized into chapters in the same order as the first part of the book: Euclidean, spherical, and hyperbolic plane geometry, solid geometry, and higher-dimensional geometry.

The book is heavily illustrated, including examples of ornamental patterns with the symmetries described, and twelve two-color stereoscopic images. Applications of its material, touched on in the book, include art and decoration, crystallography, urban planning, and the study of plant growth.

== Audience and reception ==
Reviewer W. L. Edge writes that the book's exposition combines "lightness of touch and conciseness of exposition in a quite delightful way", and H. S. M. Coxeter similarly writes that the book has "everything that could be desired in a mathematical monograph: a pleasant style, careful explanation ..., [and] a great variety of topics with a single unifying idea".

C. A. Rogers finds some of the proofs in the second part unconvincing and incomplete. Patrick du Val complains that the level of difficulty is uneven, with the second part of the book being significantly more technical than the first, but nevertheless recommends it "to specialists in this field", while Michael Goldberg calls the book "an excellent reference work". Although calling the content of the book excellent, J. A. Todd complains that its production is marred by poor typographic quality.

== See also ==
- List of books about polyhedra
