= William Edge =

William Edge may refer to:

- William Edge (mathematician) (1904–1997), British mathematician most known for his work in finite geometry
- Sir William Edge, 1st Baronet (1880–1948), British Liberal, later National Liberal politician and businessman

== See also ==
- Edge (disambiguation)
