= Károly Bezdek =

Hungarian-Canadian mathematician

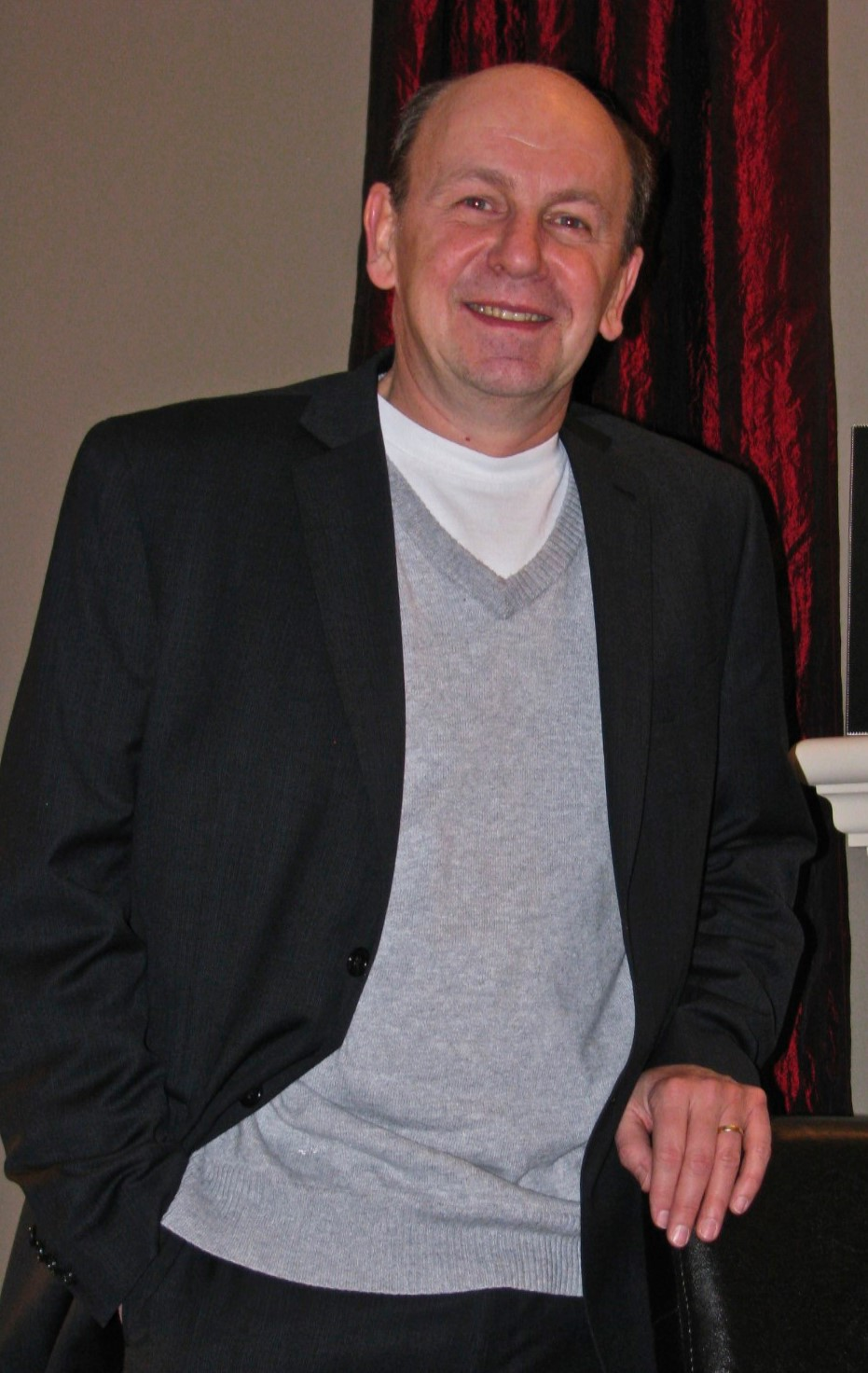
- Born: May 28, 1955 (age 71); Budapest, Hungary
- Known for: books "Classical topics in discrete geometry", Springer, 2010 and "Lectures on sphere arrangements - the discrete geometric side", Springer, 2013
- Awards: László Fejes Tóth Prize (2015), Research Excellence Award of the University of Calgary (2017), Immigrant of Distinction Award for Lifetime Achievement of the City of Calgary (2020)

Academic background
- Education: Eötvös Loránd University (Ph.D., Math., 1980; Dr.habil., Math., 1997) and Hungarian Academy of Sciences (Candidate, 1985; Doctorate, 1995)
- Doctoral advisor: Károly Böröczky (Eötvös Loránd University)

Academic work
- Institutions: Eötvös Loránd University, University of Calgary, and University of Pannonia
- Main interests: Convex and discrete geometry
- Notable ideas: Theorems on extremal properties of packings, contact numbers, coverings, illumination numbers, Voronoi diagrams, ball-polyhedra, molecules, and billiards
- Website: http://contacts.ucalgary.ca/info/math/profiles/101-152921

Károly Bezdek (born May 28, 1955, in Budapest, Hungary) is a Hungarian-Canadian mathematician. He is a professor as well as a Canada Research Chair of mathematics and the director of the Centre for Computational and Discrete Geometry at the University of Calgary in Calgary, Alberta, Canada. Also he is a professor (on leave) of mathematics at the University of Pannonia in Veszprém, Hungary. His main research interests are in geometry in particular, in combinatorial, computational, convex, and discrete geometry. He has authored 3 books and more than 130 research papers. He is a founding Editor-in-Chief of the e-journal Contributions to Discrete Mathematics (CDM).

== Early life and family ==
Károly Bezdek was born in Budapest, Hungary, but grew up in Dunaújváros, Hungary. His parents are Károly Bezdek Sr. (mechanical engineer) and Magdolna Cserey. His brother András Bezdek is also a mathematician. Károly and his brother have scored at the top level in several Mathematics and Physics competitions for high school and university students in Hungary. Károly's list of awards include winning the first prize in the traditional KöMal (Hungarian Math. Journal for Highschool Students) contest in the academic year 1972–1973, as well as winning the first prize for the research results presented at the National Science Conference for Hungarian Undergraduate Students (TDK) in 1978. Károly entered the Faculty of Science of the Eötvös Loránd University in Hungary, and completed his Diploma in Mathematics in 1978. Bezdek is married to Éva Bezdek, and has three sons: Dániel, Máté and Márk.

== Career ==
Károly Bezdek received his Ph.D. (1980) as well as his Habilitation degree (1997) in mathematics from Eötvös Loránd University, in Budapest, Hungary and his Candidate of Mathematical Sciences degree (1985) as well as his Doctor of Mathematical Sciences degree (1995) from the Hungarian Academy of Sciences. He has been a faculty member of the Department of Geometry at Eötvös Loránd University in Budapest since 1978. In particular, he has been the chair of that department between 1999-2006 and a full professor between 1998 and 2012. During 1978–2003, while being on a number of special leaves from Eötvös Loránd University, he has held numerous visiting positions at research institutions in Canada, Germany, the Netherlands, and United States. This included a period of about 7 years at the Department of Mathematics of Cornell University in Ithaca, New York. Between 1998 and 2001 Bezdek was appointed a Széchenyi Professor of mathematics at Eötvös Loránd University, in Budapest, Hungary. From 2003 Károly Bezdek is the Canada Research Chair of computational and discrete geometry at the Department of Mathematics and Statistics of the University of Calgary and is the director of the Center for Computational and Discrete Geometry at the University of Calgary. Between 2006 and 2010 Bezdek was an associated member of the Alfréd Rényi Institute of Mathematics in Budapest, Hungary. From 2010 Bezdek is a full professor (on leave) at the Department of Mathematics of the University of Pannonia in Veszprém, Hungary. Between July–December, 2011 Bezdek was a program co-chair of the 6 month thematic program on discrete geometry and its applications at the Fields Institute in Toronto, Ontario, Canada. Also, he is one of the three founding editors-in-chief of the free peer-reviewed electronic journal Contributions to Discrete Mathematics.

== Research interests and notable results ==
His research interests are in combinatorial, computational, convex and discrete geometry including some aspects of geometric analysis, rigidity and optimization. He is the author of more than 130 research papers and has written three research monographs. In particular, he is known for the following works:

- A new part of discrete geometry is studied in K. Bezdek and Zs. Lángi, Volumetric Discrete Geometry, Chapman and Hall - CRC Press, Boca Raton, FL, 2019, which is centered around several outstanding problems of discrete geometry where the volume plays a significant role. The results and proofs reflect and stimulate the fruitful interplay between linear algebra, geometry, geometric analysis, and combinatorics.
- A proof of the Goodman-Goodman Conjecture (1945) for centrally symmetric convex bodies in Euclidean d-space for d > 1 and a counterexample to it for convex bodies in general (joint work with Zsolt Lángi, Budapest University of Technology and Economics); published in K. Bezdek and Zs. Lángi, On non-separable families of positive homothetic convex bodies, Discrete and Computational Geometry 56/3 (2016), 802–813.
- A proof of the Boltyanski–Hadwiger Conjecture (1960) for wide intersections of congruent balls (also called fat spindle convex bodies) in Euclidean spaces of dimensions greater than or equal to 15; published in K. Bezdek, Illuminating spindle convex bodies and minimizing the volume of spherical sets of constant width, Discrete and Computational Geometry 47/2 (2012), 275–287.
- A variational characterization of shortest billiard trajectories in convex bodies of Euclidean d-space for d > 1 (joint work with Dániel Bezdek); published in D. Bezdek and K. Bezdek, Shortest billiard trajectories, Geometriae Dedicata 141/1 (2009), 197–206.
- A proof of tight bounds for the vertex index of (unit) balls in normed spaces supporting a quantitative approach to the Boltyanski–Hadwiger Conjecture (joint work with Alexander Litvak, University of Alberta); published in K. Bezdek and A. E. Litvak, On the vertex index of convex bodies, Advances in Mathematics 215/2 (2007), 626–641.
- A proof of the Kneser–Poulsen Conjecture (1955) for hemispheres in spherical d-space for all d > 1 (joint work with Robert Connelly, Cornell University); published in K. Bezdek and R. Connelly, The Kneser–Poulsen conjecture for spherical polytopes, Discrete and Computational Geometry 32 (2004), 101–106.
- A proof of the Kneser–Poulsen Conjecture (1955) in the Euclidean plane (joint work with Robert Connelly, Cornell University); published in K. Bezdek and R. Connelly, Pushing disks apart – the Kneser–Poulsen conjecture in the plane, Journal für die reine und angewandte Mathematik 553 (2002), 221–236.
- A stronger form of Rogers's lemma and its application to the problem of minimizing surface area of Voronoi cells in unit ball packings; published in K. Bezdek, Improving Rogers' upper bound for the density of unit ball packings via estimating the surface area of Voronoi cells from below in Euclidean d-space for all d > 7, Discrete and Computational Geometry 28 (2002), 75–106 and in K. Bezdek, On a stronger form of Rogers's lemma and the minimum surface area of Voronoi cells in unit ball packings, Journal für die reine und angewandte Mathematik 518 (2000), 131–143.
- A solution of John Horton Conway's "fried potato problem" (joint work with András Bezdek, Auburn University); published in A. Bezdek and K. Bezdek, A solution of Conway's fried potato problem, Bulletin of the London Mathematical Society 27 (1995), 492–496.
- A proof of the Boltyanski–Hadwiger Conjecture (1960) for convex polyhedra with symmetry in Euclidean 3-space; published in K. Bezdek, The problem of illumination of the boundary of a convex body by affine subspaces, Mathematika 38 (1991), 362–375.
- A proof of László Fejes Tóth's Hyperbolic Disk Packing Conjecture; published in K. Bezdek, Ausfüllung eines Kreises durch kongruente Kreise in der hyperbolischen Ebene, Studia Scientiarum Mathematicarum Hungarica 17 (1982), 353–366.

== Books ==
His three research monographs "Classical Topics in Discrete Geometry", CMS Books in Mathematics, Springer, New York, 2010, "Lectures on Sphere Arrangements - the Discrete Geometric Side", Fields Institute Monographs, Springer, New York, 2013, and "Volumetric Discrete Geometry", Discrete Mathematics and Its Applications, Chapman and Hall - CRC Press, Boca Raton, FL, 2019 (co-authored with Zs. Lángi), lead the reader to the frontiers of discrete geometry. The conference proceedings "Discrete Geometry and Optimization", Fields Institute Communications, Springer, New York, 2013, edited jointly by him, Antoine Deza (McMaster University) and Yinyu Ye (Stanford University) reflects and stimulates the fruitful interplay between discrete geometry and optimization.

== Awards ==
22 October 2020: 2020 Immigrant of Distinction Award for Lifetime Achievement of the City of Calgary

15 May 2017: 2017 Research Excellence Award of the University of Calgary

19 June 2015: 2015 László Fejes Tóth Prize (Hungarian: Fejes Tóth László-díj)
