= Computing the Continuous Discretely =

2007 mathematics textbook

- First edition cover
- Author: Matthias Beck and Sinai Robins
- Publisher: Springer-Verlag
- Publication date: 2007

Computing the Continuous Discretely: Integer-Point Enumeration in Polyhedra is an undergraduate-level textbook in geometry, on the interplay between the volume of convex polytopes and the number of integer lattice points they contain. It was written by Matthias Beck and Sinai Robins, and published in 2007 by Springer-Verlag in their Undergraduate Texts in Mathematics series (Vol. 154). A second edition was published in 2015, and a German translation of the first edition by Kord Eickmeyer, Das Kontinuum diskret berechnen, was published by Springer in 2008.

== Topics ==
The book begins with a motivating problem, the coin problem of determining which amounts of money can be represented (and what is the largest non-representable amount of money) for a given system of coin values. Other topics touched on include face lattices of polytopes and the Dehn–Sommerville equations relating numbers of faces; Pick's theorem and the Ehrhart polynomials, both of which relate lattice counting to volume; generating functions, Fourier transforms, and Dedekind sums, different ways of encoding sequences of numbers into mathematical objects; Green's theorem and its discretization; Bernoulli polynomials; the Euler–Maclaurin formula for the difference between a sum and the corresponding integral; special polytopes including zonotopes, the Birkhoff polytope, and permutohedra; and the enumeration of magic squares. In this way, the topics of the book connect together geometry, number theory, and combinatorics.

== Audience and reception ==
This book is written at an undergraduate level, and provides many exercises, making it suitable as an undergraduate textbook. Little mathematical background is assumed, except for some complex analysis towards the end of the book. The book also includes open problems, of more interest to researchers in these topics. As reviewer Darren Glass writes, "Even people who are familiar with the material would almost certainly learn something from the clear and engaging exposition that these two authors use."

Reviewer Margaret Bayer calls the book "coherent and tightly developed ... accessible and engaging", and reviewer Oleg Karpenkov calls it "outstanding".

== See also ==
- List of books about polyhedra
