= Lectures in Geometric Combinatorics =

2004 mathematics textbook

- Author: Rekha R. Thomas
- Language: English
- Genre: Mathematics
- Publisher: American Mathematical Society
- Publication date: 2006
- Publication place: United States

Lectures in Geometric Combinatorics is a textbook on polyhedral combinatorics. It was written by Rekha R. Thomas, based on a course given by Thomas at the 2004 Park City Mathematics Institute, and published by the American Mathematical Society and Institute for Advanced Study in 2006, as volume 33 of their Student Mathematical Library book series.

== Topics ==
The 14 chapters of the book can be grouped into two parts, with the first 2/3 of the book concerning the combinatorial properties of convex polytopes and the remainder connecting these topics to abstract algebra.

The topics covered include Schlegel diagrams and Gale diagrams, irrational polytopes, point set triangulations, regular triangulations and their polyhedral representation by secondary polytopes, the permutohedron as an example of a secondary polytope, Gröbner bases, toric ideals, and toric varieties, and the connections between Gröbner bases of toric ideals and regular triangulations of points.

== Audience and reception ==
Although originally presented as an advanced undergraduate course, the book is also suitable for graduate students and for researchers interested in beginning work in this area. It requires only an undergraduate level of background material in mathematics (particularly linear algebra), and includes exercises making it suitable as a textbook. Reviewers Miklós Bóna and Alexander Zvonkin suggest it as a "quick introduction" to its topics, after which other books on the same topics can provide greater depth.

== See also ==
- List of books about polyhedra
