= Convex Polyhedra (book) =

1950 book on geometry by Aleksandr Danilovich Aleksandrov

- Author: Aleksandr Danilovich Aleksandrov
- Original title: Выпуклые многогранники
- Translator: Nurlan S. Dairbekov, Semën Samsonovich Kutateladze and Alexei B. Sossinsky
- Language: Russian
- Genre: Mathematics
- Publication date: 1950

Convex Polyhedra is a book on the mathematics of convex polyhedra, written by Soviet mathematician Aleksandr Danilovich Aleksandrov, and originally published in Russian in 1950, under the title Выпуклые многогранники. It was translated into German by Wilhelm Süss as Konvexe Polyeder in 1958. An updated edition, translated into English by Nurlan S. Dairbekov, Semën Samsonovich Kutateladze and Alexei B. Sossinsky, with added material by Victor Zalgaller, L. A. Shor, and Yu. A. Volkov, was published as Convex Polyhedra by Springer-Verlag in 2005.

== Topics ==
The main focus of the book is on the specification of geometric data that will determine uniquely the shape of a three-dimensional convex polyhedron, up to some class of geometric transformations such as congruence or similarity. It considers both bounded polyhedra (convex hulls of finite sets of points) and unbounded polyhedra (intersections of finitely many half-spaces).

The 1950 Russian edition of the book included 11 chapters. The first chapter covers the basic topological properties of polyhedra, including their topological equivalence to spheres (in the bounded case) and Euler's polyhedral formula. After a lemma of Augustin Cauchy on the impossibility of labeling the edges of a polyhedron by positive and negative signs so that each vertex has at least four sign changes, the remainder of chapter 2 outlines the content of the remaining book. Chapters 3 and 4 prove Alexandrov's uniqueness theorem, characterizing the surface geometry of polyhedra as being exactly the metric spaces that are topologically spherical locally like the Euclidean plane except at a finite set of points of positive angular defect, obeying Descartes's theorem on total angular defect that the total angular defect should be $4\pi$. Chapter 5 considers the metric spaces defined in the same way that are topologically a disk rather than a sphere, and studies the flexible polyhedral surfaces that result.

Chapters 6 through 8 of the book are related to a theorem of Hermann Minkowski that a convex polyhedron is uniquely determined by the areas and directions of its faces, with a new proof based on invariance of domain. A generalization of this theorem implies that the same is true for the perimeters and directions of the faces. Chapter 9 concerns the reconstruction of three-dimensional polyhedra from a two-dimensional perspective view, by constraining the vertices of the polyhedron to lie on rays through the point of view. The original Russian edition of the book concludes with two chapters, 10 and 11, related to Cauchy's theorem that polyhedra with flat faces form rigid structures, and describing the differences between the rigidity and infinitesimal rigidity of polyhedra, as developed analogously to Cauchy's rigidity theorem by Max Dehn.

The 2005 English edition adds comments and bibliographic information regarding many problems that were posed as open in the 1950 edition but subsequently solved. It also includes in a chapter of supplementary material the translations of three related articles by Volkov and Shor, including a simplified proof of Pogorelov's theorems generalizing Alexandrov's uniqueness theorem to non-polyhedral convex surfaces.

== Audience and reception ==
Robert Connelly writes that, for a work describing significant developments in the theory of convex polyhedra that was however hard to access in the west, the English translation of Convex Polyhedra was long overdue. He calls the material on Alexandrov's uniqueness theorem "the star result in the book", and he writes that the book "had a great influence on countless Russian mathematicians". Nevertheless, he complains about the book's small number of exercises, and about an inconsistent level presentation that fails to distinguish important and basic results from specialized technicalities.

Although intended for a broad mathematical audience, Convex Polyhedra assumes a significant level of background knowledge in material including topology, differential geometry, and linear algebra. Reviewer Vasyl Gorkaviy recommends Convex Polyhedra to students and professional mathematicians as an introduction to the mathematics of convex polyhedra. He also writes that, over 50 years after its original publication, "it still remains of great interest for specialists", after being updated to include many new developments and to list new open problems in the area.

== See also ==
- List of books about polyhedra
