= Descartes on Polyhedra =

Book by Pasquale Joseph Federico

- Author: Pasquale Joseph Federico
- Language: English
- Genre: Non-fiction
- Publisher: Springer-Verlag
- Publication date: 1982

Descartes on Polyhedra: A Study of the "De solidorum elementis" is a book in the history of mathematics, concerning the work of René Descartes on polyhedra. Central to the book is the disputed priority for Euler's polyhedral formula between Leonhard Euler, who published an explicit version of the formula, and Descartes, whose De solidorum elementis includes a result from which the formula is easily derived.

Descartes on Polyhedra was written by Pasquale Joseph Federico (1902–1982), and published posthumously by Springer-Verlag in 1982, with the assistance of Federico's widow Bianca M. Federico, as volume 4 of their book series Sources in the History of Mathematics and Physical Sciences. The Basic Library List Committee of the Mathematical Association of America has suggested its inclusion in undergraduate mathematics libraries.

== Topics ==
The original Latin manuscript of De solidorum elementis was written circa 1630 by Descartes; reviewer Marjorie Senechal calls it "the first general treatment of polyhedra", Descartes' only work in this area, and unfinished, with its statements disordered and some incorrect. It turned up in Stockholm in Descartes' estate after his death in 1650, was soaked for three days in the Seine when the ship carrying it back to Paris was wrecked, and survived long enough for Gottfried Wilhelm Leibniz to copy it in 1676 before disappearing for good. Leibniz's copy, also lost, was rediscovered in Hannover around 1860. The first part of Descartes on Polyhedra relates this history, sketches the biography of Descartes, provides an eleven-page facsimile reproduction of Leibniz's copy, and gives a transcription, English translation, and commentary on this text, including explanations of some of its notation.

In De solidorum elementis, Descartes states (without proof) Descartes' theorem on total angular defect, a discrete version of the Gauss–Bonnet theorem according to which the angular defects of the vertices of a convex polyhedron (the amount by which the angles at that vertex fall short of the $2\pi$ angle surrounding any point on a flat plane) always sum to exactly $4\pi$. Descartes used this theorem to prove that the five Platonic solids are the only possible regular polyhedra. It is also possible to derive Euler's formula $V-E+F=2$ relating the numbers of vertices, edges, and faces of a convex polyhedron from Descartes' theorem, and De solidorum elementis also includes a formula more closely resembling Euler's relating the number of vertices, faces, and plane angles of a polyhedron. Since the rediscovery of Descartes' manuscript, many scholars have argued that the credit for Euler's formula should go to Descartes rather than to Leonhard Euler, who published the formula (with an incorrect proof) in 1752. The second part of Descartes on Polyhedra reviews this debate, and compares the reasoning of Descartes and Euler on these topics. Ultimately, the book concludes that Descartes probably did not discover Euler's formula, and reviewers Senechal and H. S. M. Coxeter agree, writing that Descartes did not have a concept for the edges of a polyhedron, and without that could not have formulated Euler's formula itself. Subsequently, to this work, it was discovered that Francesco Maurolico had provided a more direct and much earlier predecessor to the work of Euler, an observation in 1537 (without proof of its more general applicability) that Euler's formula itself holds true for the five Platonic solids.

The second part of Descartes' book, and the third part of Descartes on Polyhedra, connects the theory of polyhedra to number theory. It concerns figurate numbers defined by Descartes from polyhedra, generalizing the classical Greek definitions of figurate numbers such as the square numbers and triangular numbers from two-dimensional polygons. In this part Descartes uses both the Platonic solids and some of the semiregular polyhedra, but not the snub polyhedra.

== Audience and reception ==
Reviewer F. A. Sherk, after noting the obvious relevance of Descartes on Polyhedra to historians of mathematics, recommends it as well to geometers and to amateur mathematicians. He writes that it provides a good introduction to some important topics in the mathematics of polyhedra, makes an interesting connection to number theory, and is easily readable without much background knowledge. Marjorie Senechal points out that, beyond the question of priority between Descartes and Euler, the book is also useful for illuminating what was known of geometry more generally at the time of Descartes. More briefly, reviewer L. Führer calls the book beautiful, readable, and lively, but expensive.

== See also ==
- List of books about polyhedra
