= Treks into Intuitive Geometry =

2015 mathematics book by Akiyama and Matsunaga

- First edition
- Author: Jin Akiyama; Kiyoko Matsunaga
- Genre: Mathematics
- Publisher: Springer-Verlag
- Publication date: 2015
- ISBN: 978-4-431-55841-5

Treks into Intuitive Geometry: The World of Polygons and Polyhedra is a book on geometry, written as a discussion between a teacher and a student in the style of a Socratic dialogue. It was written by Japanese mathematician Jin Akiyama and science writer Kiyoko Matsunaga, and published by Springer-Verlag in 2015 (ISBN 978-4-431-55841-5), with an expanded second edition in 2024 (ISBN 978-981-99-8607-1).

== Topics ==
The term "intuitive geometry" of the title was used by László Fejes Tóth to refer to results in geometry that are accessible to the general public, and the book concerns topics of this type.

The book has 16 self-contained chapters, each beginning with an illustrative puzzle or real-world application. It includes material on tessellations, polyhedra, and honeycombs, unfoldings of polyhedra and tessellations of unfoldings, cross sections of polyhedra, measuring boxes, gift wrapping, packing problems, wallpaper groups, pentagonal tilings, the Conway criterion for prototiles and Escher-like tilings of the plane by animal-shaped figures, aperiodic tilings including the Penrose tiling, the art gallery theorem, the Euler characteristic, dissection problems and the Dehn invariant, and the Steiner tree problem.

The book is heavily illustrated. And although the results of the book are demonstrated in an accessible way, the book provides sequences of deductions leading to each major claim, and more-complete proofs and references are provided in an appendix.

== Audience and reception ==
Although it was initially developed from course material offered to undergraduates at the Tokyo University of Science, the book is aimed at a broad audience, and assumes only a high-school level knowledge of geometry. It could be used to encourage children in mathematics as well as to provide material for teachers and public lecturers. There is enough depth of material to also retain the interest of readers with a more advanced mathematical background.

Reviewer Matthieu Jacquemet writes that the ordering of topics is unintuitive and the dialogue-based format "artificial", but reviewer Tricia Muldoon Brown instead suggests that this format allows the work to flow very smoothly, "more like a novel or a play than a textbook ... with the ease of reading purely for pleasure". Jacquemet assesses the book as "well illustrated and entertaining", and Brown writes that it "is a delightful read".

Reviewer Michael Fox disagrees, finding the dialogue irritating and the book overall "rather disappointing". He cites as problematic the book's cursory treatment of some of its topics, and in particular its treatment of tiling patterns as purely monochromatic, its omission of the frieze groups, and its use of demonstrations by special examples that do not have all the features of the general case. He also complains about idiosyncratic terminology, the use of decimal approximations instead of exact formulas for angles, the small scale of some figures, and an uneven level of difficulty of material. Nevertheless, he writes that "this is an interesting work, with much that cannot be found elsewhere".
