= Journal of the Patent and Trademark Office Society =

- Discipline: Intellectual property law
- Language: English

Publication details
- Former name(s): Journal of the Patent Office Society
- History: 1918-present
- Publisher: Patent and Trademark Office Society (United States)
- Frequency: Quarterly

Standard abbreviations
- Bluebook: J. Pat. & Trademark Off. Soc'y
- ISO 4: J. Pat. Trademark Off. Soc.

Indexing
- ISSN: 0882-9098
- LCCN: 85641801
- OCLC no.: 818994100

Links
- Journal homepage

The Journal of the Patent and Trademark Office Society is a quarterly peer-reviewed law journal covering intellectual property law. It was established in 1918.

== History ==
The journal was established as Journal of the Patent Office Society in September 1918, obtaining its current name in 1985 to include trademarks. Before the first issue of the journal was published, a collection of papers, speeches, and articles written by patent examiners to guide one another on the practice of patent examination dated as early as 1914 was compiled by Charles Mortimer, collectively or informally referred to as "The Mortimer Papers", and formed the basis of what would later become the contents of the journal.

== Citations ==
The United States Supreme Court has cited the Journal of the Patent and Trademark Office Society in various opinions pertaining to patent law or intellectual property law, including United States v. Arthrex, Inc., Minerva Surgical, Inc. v. Hologic, Inc., Oil States Energy Services, LLC v. Greene's Energy Group, LLC, Bilski v. Kappos, Markman v. Westview Instruments, Inc., and Eldred v. Ashcroft.
