= Polyhedra (book) =

Geometry book

- Author: Peter R. Cromwell
- Subject: Polyhedra
- Genre: Mathematics
- Publisher: Cambridge University Press
- Publication date: 1997

Polyhedra is a book on polyhedra, by Peter R. Cromwell. It was published by in 1997 by the Cambridge University Press, with an unrevised paperback edition in 1999.

== Topics ==
The book covers both the mathematics of polyhedra and its historical development, limiting itself only to three-dimensional geometry. The notion of what it means to be a polyhedron has varied over the history of the subject, as have other related definitions, an issue that the book handles largely by keeping definitions informal and flexible, and by pointing out problematic examples for these intuitive definitions. Many digressions help make the material readable, and the book includes many illustrations, including historical reproductions, line diagrams, and photographs of models of polyhedra.

Polyhedra has ten chapters, the first four of which are primarily historical, with the remaining six more technical. The first chapter outlines the history of polyhedra from the ancient world up to Hilbert's third problem on the possibility of cutting polyhedra into pieces and reassembling them into different polyhedra. The second chapter considers the symmetries of polyhedra, the Platonic solids and Archimedean solids, and the honeycombs formed by space-filling polyhedra. Chapter 3 covers the history of geometry in medieval Islam and early Europe, including connections to astronomy and the study of visual perspective, and Chapter 4 concerns the contributions of Johannes Kepler to polyhedra and his attempts to use polyhedra to model the structure of the universe.

Among the remaining chapters, Chapter 5 concerns angles and trigonometry, the Euler characteristic, and the Gauss–Bonnet theorem (including also some speculation on whether René Descartes knew about the Euler characteristic prior to Euler). Chapter 6 covers Cauchy's rigidity theorem and flexible polyhedra, and chapter 7 covers self-intersecting star polyhedra. Chapter 8 returns to the symmetries of polyhedra and the classification of possible symmetries, and chapter 9 concerns problems in graph coloring related to polyhedra such as the four color theorem. The final chapter includes material on polyhedral compounds and metamorphoses of polyhedra.

== Audience and reception ==
Most of the book requires little in the way of mathematical background, and can be read by interested amateurs; however, some of the material on symmetry towards the end of the book requires some background in group theory. Reviewer Bill Casselman writes that it would probably not be appropriate to use as a textbook in this area, but could be valuable as additional reference material for an undergraduate geometry class. Reviewer Thomas Bending writes that "The writing is clear and entertaining", and reviewer Ed Sandifer writes that Polyhedra is "solid and fascinating ... likely to become the classic book on the topic ... worthy of many readings". Despite complaints about vague referencing of its sources and credits for its historical images, missed connections to modern work in group theory, difficult-to-follow proofs, and occasionally-clumsy illustrations, and typographical errors, Casselman also reviews the book positively, calling it "valuable and a labor of love".

However, two experts on the topics of the book who also reviewed it, polyhedral combinatorics specialist Peter McMullen and historian of mathematics Judith Grabiner, were much less positive. McMullen writes that "There appears to be some degree of carelessness in the preparation of the book", pointing to errors including calling the Dehn invariant a number, mis-dating Hilbert's problems, misspelling the name of artist Wenzel Jamnitzer and misattributing to Jamnitzer an image by M. C. Escher, and using idiosyncratic and occasionally incorrect names for polyhedra. McMullen writes of these errors that "every time I look at the book, I find more", casting into doubt the other less-familiar parts of the book's content. And Grabiner faults the book's history as naive or mistaken, citing as examples its claims that the discovery of irrational numbers ended Pythagorean mysticism, and that pre-Keplerian astronomy consisted only of observation and record-keeping. She accuses Cromwell of basing his narrative on secondary sources rather than checking the original sources he cites, points to sloppy sourcing of historical quotations, and complains about the book's minimal coverage of Islamic and medieval geometry. She writes that the book can be enjoyed as "a treasury" of "beautiful models" and "examples of the impact of polyhedra on the imagination of artists" but should not be relied on for historical insights.

== See also ==
- List of books about polyhedra
