= László Fejes Tóth =

Hungarian mathematician (1915–2005)

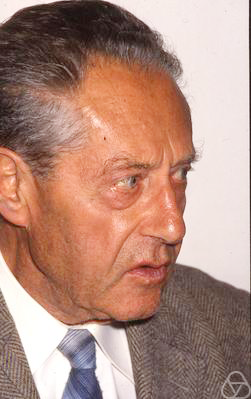
- László Fejes Tóth, 1991
- Born: László Tóth; 12 March 1915; Szeged, Hungary
- Died: 17 March 2005 (aged 90); Budapest, Hungary
- Awards: Kossuth Prize (1957), State Award (1973), Gauss Bicentennial Medal (1977), and Gold Medal of the Hungarian Academy of Sciences (2002)

Academic background
- Education: Pázmány Péter University, as of 1950 Eötvös Loránd University

Academic work
- Main interests: Discrete and combinatorial geometry
- Notable works: Lagerungen in der Ebene, auf der Kugel und im Raum; Regular Figures
- Notable ideas: Theorems on packings and coverings of geometrical objects, including the packing of spheres
- Influenced: Thomas Hales, Károly Bezdek

László Fejes Tóth (Hungarian: Fejes Tóth László, pronounced [ˈfɛjɛʃ ˈtoːt ˈlaːsloː]; 12 March 1915 – 17 March 2005) was a Hungarian mathematician who specialized in geometry. He proved that a lattice pattern is the most efficient way to pack centrally symmetric convex sets on the Euclidean plane (a generalization of Thue's theorem, a 2-dimensional analog of the Kepler conjecture). He also investigated the sphere packing problem. He was the first to show, in 1953, that proof of the Kepler conjecture can be reduced to a finite case analysis and, later, that the problem might be solved using a computer.

He was a member of the Hungarian Academy of Sciences (from 1962) and a director of the Alfréd Rényi Institute of Mathematics (1970-1983). He received both the Kossuth Prize (1957) and State Award (1973).

Together with H.S.M. Coxeter and Paul Erdős, he laid the foundations of discrete geometry.

== Early life and career ==
As described in a 1999 interview with István Hargittai, Fejes Tóth's father was a railway worker, who advanced in his career within the railway organization ultimately to earn a doctorate in law. Fejes Tóth's mother taught Hungarian and German literature in a high school. The family moved to Budapest, when Fejes Tóth was five; there he attended elementary school and high school—the Széchenyi István Reálgimnázium—where his interest in mathematics began.

Fejes Tóth attended Pázmány Péter University, now the Eötvös Loránd University. As a freshman, he developed a generalized solution regarding Cauchy exponential series, which he published in the proceedings of the French Academy of Sciences—1935. He then received his doctorate at Pázmány Péter University, under the direction of Lipót Fejér.

After university, he served as a soldier for two years, but received a medical exemption. In 1941 he joined the University of Kolozsvár (Cluj). It was here that he became interested in packing problems. In 1944, he returned to Budapest to teach mathematics at Árpád High School. Between 1946 and 1949 he lectured at Pázmány Péter University and starting in 1949 became a professor at the University of Veszprém (now University of Pannonia) for 15 years, where he was the primary developer of the "geometric patterns" theory "of the plane, the sphere and the surface space" and where he "had studied non grid-like structures and quasicrystals" which later became an independent discipline, as reported by János Pach.

The editors of a book dedicated to Fejes Tóth described some highlights of his early work; e.g. having shown that the maximum density of a packing of repeated symmetric convex bodies occurs with a lattice pattern of packing. He also showed that, of all convex polytopes of given surface area that are equivalent to a given Platonic solid (e.g. a tetrahedron or an octahedron), a regular polytope always has the largest possible volume. He developed a technique that proved Steiner's conjecture for the cube and for the dodecahedron. By 1953, Fejes Tóth had written dozens of papers devoted to these types of fundamental issues. His distinguished academic career allowed him to travel abroad beyond the Iron Curtain to attend international conferences and teach at various universities, including those at Freiburg; Madison, Wisconsin; Ohio; and Salzburg.

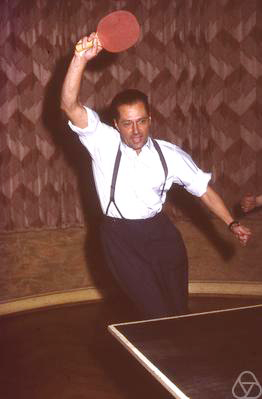
Fejes Tóth, 1958

Fejes Tóth met his wife in university. She was a chemist. They were parents of three children, two sons—one (Gábor) a professor of mathematics at the Alfréd Rényi Institute of Mathematics, the other a professor of physiology at Dartmouth College—and one daughter, a psychologist. He enjoyed sports, being skilled at table tennis, tennis, and gymnastics. A family photograph shows him swinging by his arms over the top of a high bar when he was around fifty.

Fejes Tóth held the following positions over his career:

- Assistant instructor, University of Kolozsvár (Cluj) (1941–44)
- Teacher, Árpád High School (1944–48)
- Private Lecturer, Pázmány Péter University (1946–48)
- Professor, University of Veszprém (1949–64)
- Researcher, then director (in 1970), Mathematical Research Institute (Alfréd Rényi Institute of Mathematics) (1965–83)

In addition to his positions in residence, he was a corresponding member of the Saxonian Academy of Sciences and Humanities, Akademie der Wissenschaften der DDR, and of the Braunschweigische Wissenschaftlische Gesellschaft.

== Work on regular figures ==
According to J. A. Todd, a reviewer of Fejes Tóth's book Regular Figures, Fejes Tóth divided the topic into two sections. One, entitled "Systematology of the Regular Figures", develops a theory of "regular and Archimedean polyhedra and of regular polytopes". Todd explains that the treatment includes:

- Plane Ornaments, including two-dimensional crystallographic groups
- Spherical arrangements, including an enumeration of the 32 crystal classes
- Hyperbolic tessellations, those discrete groups generated by two operations whose product is involutary
- Polyhedra, including regular solids and convex Archimedean solids
- Regular polytopes
In work dedicated to Fejes Tóth, this compact binary circle packing was shown to be the densest possible planar packing of discs with this size ratio.

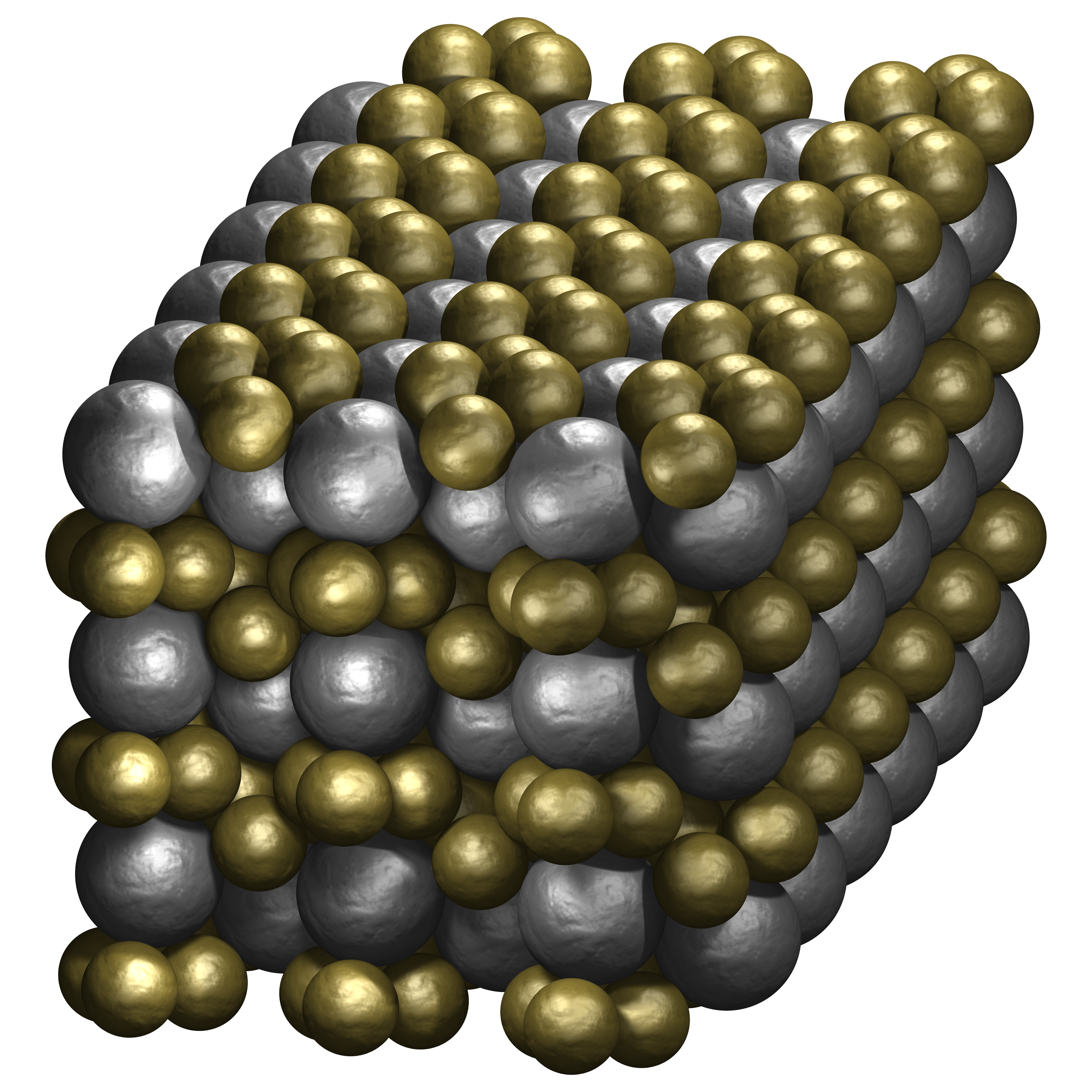
A dense packing of spheres

Dodecahedron
(Regular convex polyhedron)

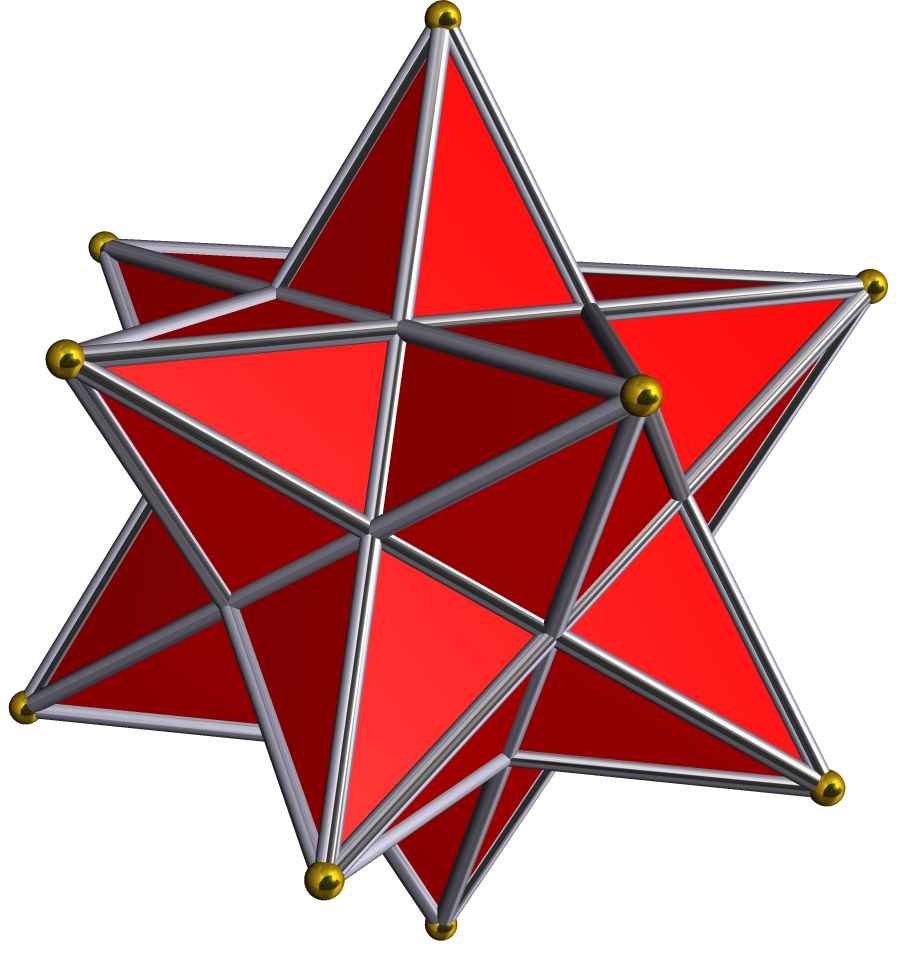
Small stellated dodecahedron
(Regular star—a concave polyhedron)

Heptagon
(A 2-dimensional regular polytope)

A semi-regular tessellation with three prototiles: a triangle, a square and a hexagon.

The other section, entitled "Genetics of the Regular Figures", covers a number of special problems, according to Todd. These problems include "packings and coverings of circles in a plane, and ... with tessellations on a sphere" and also problems "in the hyperbolic plane, and in Euclidean space of three or more dimensions." At the time, Todd opined that those problems were "a subject in which there is still much scope for research, and one which calls for considerable ingenuity in approaching its problems".

== Honors and recognition ==
Diagram of hexagonal close packing (left) and cubic close packing (right), as seen from different angles.

Imre Bárány credited Fejes Tóth with several influential proofs in the field of discrete and convex geometry, pertaining to packings and coverings by circles, to convex sets in a plane and to packings and coverings in higher dimensions, including the first correct proof of Thue's theorem. He credits Fejes Tóth, along with Paul Erdős, as having helped to "create the school of Hungarian discrete geometry."

Fejes Tóth's monograph, Lagerungen in der Ebene, auf der Kugel und im Raum, which was translated into Russian and Japanese, won him the Kossuth Prize in 1957 and the Hungarian Academy of Sciences membership in 1962.

William Edge, another reviewer of Regular Figures, cites Fejes Tóth's earlier work, Lagerungen in der Ebene, auf der Kugel und im Raum, as the foundation of his second chapter in Regular Figures. He emphasized that, at the time of this work, the problem of the upper bound for the density of a packing of equal spheres was still unsolved.

The approach that Fejes Tóth suggested in that work, which translates as "packing [of objects] in a plane, on a sphere and in a space", provided Thomas Hales a basis for a proof of the Kepler conjecture in 1998. The Kepler conjecture, named after the 17th-century German mathematician and astronomer Johannes Kepler, says that no arrangement of equally sized spheres filling space has a greater average density than that of the cubic close packing (face-centered cubic) and hexagonal close packing arrangements. Hales used a proof by exhaustion involving the checking of many individual cases, using complex computer calculations.

Fejes Tóth received the following prizes:

- Klug Lipót Prize (1943)
- Kossuth Prize (1957)
- State Prize (now the Széchenyi Prize) (1973)
- Tibor Szele Prize (1977)
- Gauss Bicentennial Medal (1977)
- Gold Medal of the Hungarian Academy of Sciences (2002)

He received honorary degrees from the University of Salzburg (1991) and the University of Veszprém (1997).

In 2008, a conference was convened in Fejes Tóth's memory in Budapest from June 30 – July 6; it celebrated the term, "Intuitive Geometry", coined by Fejes Tóth to refer to the kind of geometry, which is accessible to the "man in the street". According to the conference organizers, the term encompasses combinatorial geometry, the theory of packing, covering and tiling, convexity, computational geometry, rigidity theory, the geometry of numbers, crystallography and classical differential geometry.

The University of Pannonia administers the László Fejes Tóth Prize (Hungarian: Fejes Tóth László-díj) to recognize "outstanding contributions and development in the field of mathematical sciences". In 2015, the year of Fejes Tóth's centennial birth anniversary, the prize was awarded to Károly Bezdek of the University of Calgary in a ceremony held on 19 June 2015 in Veszprém, Hungary.

== Partial bibliography ==
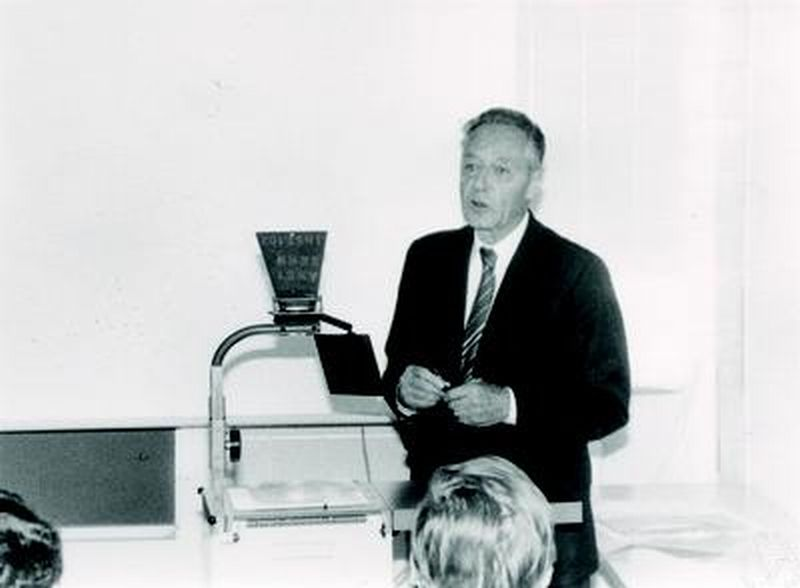
Fejes Tóth in Vienna, 1987

- Fejes Tóth, László (1935). "Des séries exponentielles de Cauchy". C. R. Acad. Sci. (in French). 200: 1712–1714. JFM 62.1191.03.
- Fejes Tóth, László (1938). "Über einige Extremumaufgaben bei Polyedern". Mat. Fiz. Lapok (in Hungarian and German). 45: 191–199. JFM 64.0732.02.
- Fejes Tóth, László (1939). "Über das Schmiegungspolyeder". Mat. Fiz. Lápok (in Hungarian and German). 46: 141–145. JFM 65.0827.01.
- Fejes Tóth, László (1938). "Sur les séries exponentielles de Cauchy". Mat. Fiz. Lapok (in Hungarian and French). 45: 115–132. JFM 64.0284.04.
- Fejes Tóth, László (1939). "Über zwei Maximumaufgaben bei Polyedern". Tôhoku Math. J. (in German). 46: 79–83. JFM 65.0826.03.
- Fejes Tóth, László (1939). "Über die Approximation konvexer Kurven durch Polygonfolgen". Compositio Mathematica (in German). 6. Groningen: 456–467. JFM 65.0822.03.
- Fejes Tóth, László (1939). "Two inequalities concerning trigonometric polynomials". J. London Math. Soc. 14: 44–46. doi:10.1112/jlms/s1-14.1.44. JFM 65.0254.01.
- Fejes Tóth, László (1940). "Über ein extremales Polyeder". Math.-naturw. Anz. Ungar. Akad. Wiss. (in Hungarian and German). 59: 476–479. JFM 66.0905.04.
- Fejes Tóth, László (1940). "Eine Bemerkung zur Approximation durch n-Eckringe". Compositio Mathematica (in German). 7. Groningen: 474–476. JFM 66.0902.05.
- Fejes Tóth, László (1940). "Sur un théorème concernant l'approximation des courbes par des suites de polygones". Ann. Scuola Norm. Sup., Pisa, Sci. Fis. Mat (in French). 2 (9): 143–145. JFM 66.0902.04.
- Fejes Tóth, László (1940). "Über einen geometrischen Satz". Math. Z. (in German). 46: 83–85. doi:10.1007/bf01181430. JFM 66.0902.03. S2CID 121092302.
- Fejes Tóth, László (1942). "Die regulären Polyeder, als Lösungen von Extremalaufgaben". Math.-naturw. Anz. Ungar. Akad. Wiss. (in Hungarian and German). 61: 471–477. JFM 68.0341.02.
- Fejes Tóth, László (1942). "Das gleichseitige Dreiecksgitter als Lösung von Extremalaufgaben". Mat. Fiz. Lapok. 49: 238–248. JFM 68.0340.04.
- Fejes Tóth, László (1942). "Über die Fouriersche Reihe der Abkühlung". Math.-naturw. Anz. Ungar. Akad. Wiss (in Hungarian and German). 61: 478–495. JFM 68.0144.03.
- Fejes Tóth, László (1950). "Some packing and covering theorems". Acta Sci. Math. 12A: 62–67.
- Fejes Tóth, László (1953), Lagerungen in der Ebene, auf der Kugel und im Raum, Die Grundlehren der Mathematischen Wissenschaften in Einzeldarstellungen mit besonderer Berücksichtigung der Anwendungsgebiete (in German), vol. LXV, Berlin, New York: Springer-Verlag, p. 238, MR 0057566
- Fejes Tóth, László (1964), Regular Figures, Oxford: Pergamon Press, p. 339
- Fejes Tóth, László (1965), Reguläre Figuren (in German), Budapest: Akadémiai Kiadó, p. 316
- Fejes Tóth, László (1971), "Lencsék legsűrűbb elhelyezése a síkban", Matematikai Lapok, 22: 209–213
- Fejes Tóth, László (1986), "Densest packing of translates of the union of two circles", Discrete and Computational Geometry, 1 (4): 307–314, doi:10.1007/bf02187703, Zbl 0606.52004
