= Rekha R. Thomas =

American mathematician

Rekha Rachel Thomas is a mathematician and operations researcher. She works as a professor of mathematics at the University of Washington, and was the Robert R. and Elaine F. Phelps Professor there from 2008 until 2012. Her research interests include mathematical optimization and computational algebra.

Thomas earned a PhD in operations research from Cornell University in 1994, supervised by Bernd Sturmfels; her dissertation concerned Gröbner bases and integer programming. Prior to joining the University of Washington in 2000, she did postdoctoral studies at Yale University and the Zuse Institute Berlin, and held a faculty position at Texas A&M University beginning in 1995.

Thomas is the author of the textbook Lectures in Geometric Combinatorics (Student Mathematical Library, 33, American Mathematical Society, 2006). She was a plenary speaker at the 21st International Symposium on Mathematical Programming in 2012.

In 2013 she became one of the inaugural fellows of the American Mathematical Society.
