= Patent and Trademark Office Society =

American society of intellectual property professionals

The Patent and Trademark Office Society (PTOS) is an American society of intellectual property professionals. The society publishes a quarterly journal, the Journal of the Patent and Trademark Office Society (JPTOS).

== History ==
Founded in 1917, the PTOS is for patent and trademark professionals and other interested individuals, and it hosts activities in both the patent and trademark fields for the membership.

== Organization and hierarchy ==
The PTOS is composed of five elected executive board members. Elections are held yearly and are performed in a remote fashion for the more than 4,200 dues-paying members. Two elected members represent each technology center from within the USPTO, ten at-large representatives, two trademark representatives, and a representative from each of the PTAB, OPLA/OPQA, CFO/CIO/CAO/OPIM, and the Directors/OGC/International Affairs make up the remainder of the PTOS Board of Directors.

== Committee structure and oversight ==
The society contains many committees including, Advisory Steering, Budget and Finance, Computer and Internet, Distribution, Education, Election, Federico Award, Historical Display, Insurance, International Relations, Journal of the PTOS, Kids in Chemistry, Legislative, Liaison, Membership, Public Relations, Rossman Award, Science Fair, Social, and Unofficial Gazette.
