= William Edge (mathematician) =

British mathematician

William Leonard Edge FRSE (8 November 1904 – 27 September 1997) was a British mathematician most known for his work in finite geometry. Students knew him as WLE.

== Life ==
Born in Stockport to schoolteacher parents (his father William Henry Edge being a headmaster), Edge attended Stockport Grammar School before winning a place at Trinity College, Cambridge in 1923 with an entrance scholarship, later graduating MA DSc. In 1928 Trinity College made him a Research Fellow and he was also an Allen Scholar.

William Edge was a geometry student of H. F. Baker at Cambridge. Edge's dissertation extended Luigi Cremona’s 1868 delineation of the quadric ruled surfaces in projective 3-space RP^{3}. Edge made a "systematic classification of the quintic and sextic ruled surfaces of three-dimensional projective space."

In 1932 E. T. Whittaker invited Edge to lecture at University of Edinburgh. An anachronism, Edge never drove a motor car and disdained the mass-media of radio and television; he was distressed by the decline of school geometry. In 1949 he became Reader, and professor in 1969.

In the 1950s Edge began to explore vector spaces over Galois fields as an entry to finite geometry. Points and lines of finite projective geometry arise as lines and planes in these spaces, and the projectivities of these spaces provide representation of some finite groups. For example, in 1954 he described the space S over GF(3): 40 points, 13 in each plane and 4 on each line. In S he described a 16-point quadric with two reguli of four lines each. He also extended work of Moore, Jordan and Dickson on the alternating group A_{8} as represented by the projective special linear group PSL(4,2). The next year he parametrized the lines of the space S over GF(3) in analogy to the Klein quadric description of lines in RP^{3}. Edge's student James Hirschfeld has advanced the science of finite geometry also.

In 1934 he was elected a Fellow of the Royal Society of Edinburgh. His proposers were Sir Edmund Taylor Whittaker, Herbert Westren Turnbull, Edward Thomas Copson and David Gibb. He won the Society's Keith Prize for 1943–45.

Edge retired in 1975. A lifelong bachelor and devout Roman Catholic, Edge spent his final years in the care of the Sisters of Nazareth House in Bonnyrigg, just south of Edinburgh, and died there on 27 September 1997.

Since 2013, every year the School of Mathematics of the University of Edinburgh celebrates the EDGE Days, an annual one-week workshop in algebraic geometry named after Edge.
