= Canceled denominations of United States currency =

Canceled banknotes and coins of the United States dollar

The United States has several coins and banknotes which were proposed at one time but never adopted.

== Banknotes ==
A three dollar bill was proposed two times during the 1860s. A design was engraved for a potential $3 United States Note, and a 1865 law called for a $3 National Bank Note, but neither proposal came to fruition.

| Denomination | Obverse | Reverse | Notes |
|---|---|---|---|
| $3 note | | | Not to be confused with fake or privately issued obsolete notes or the three-dollar Continental currency banknotes issued during the American Revolution |

== Coinage ==
There have been several United States coins which were proposed but never adopted. Most of the coins listed below, although never adopted, were produced in limited numbers as patterns.

| Denomination | Obverse | Reverse | Weight | Diameter | Material | Edge | Minted | Notes |
|---|---|---|---|---|---|---|---|---|
| Silver center cent 1¢ | | | 4.48 g | 24.00 mm | Cu (ring); Ag (plug) | reeded | 1792 | The first and only US bi-metallic coin until the 2000 Library of Congress ten dollar coin. |
| Ring cent 1¢ | | | various weights | | 90% Cu | 10% Ag (Note: Pattern coins for the ring cent were struck in various metals, including copper, aluminum, and nickel, as well as billon.) | 1850–1851, 1853 (Note: 1853 ring cents are restrikes dated 1850, although they can be distinguished from the original 1850 cents in that they use a different reverse design.), 1884–1885 | 196 ring cents (originals and restrikes) are known to exist. Examples exist with or without a hole. |
| Aluminum cent 1¢ | | | 0.937 g | 19.05 mm | 96% Al; 4% trace metals | plain | 1973–1975 | 1,579,324 coins dated 1974 were produced, but were not put in circulation and nearly all were later destroyed. |
| Two-cent billon 2¢ | | | 3.84 g | ~13.00 mm | 90% Cu; 10% Ag | plain | 1836 | |
| Two and a half cent piece 2.5¢ | | | unknown | unknown | unknown | unknown | never minted | Proposed in 1916 by US mint director Robert W. Woolley. Civil War tokens of this denomination exist. |
| Three-cent bronze 3¢ | | | 10.89 g | 28.57 mm | 95% Cu; 5% Zn | plain | 1863 | |
| Ring nickel 5¢ | | | | | | plain | 1884–1885 | |
| Gold ring half dollar 50¢ | | | | | | | 1852 | |
| Gold ring dollar $1 | | | | | | | 1849, 1852 | |
| Two dollar piece $2 | | | unknown | unknown | unknown | unknown | never minted | Proposed but not minted. Some privately struck renditions exist. |
| Stella $4 | | | 7.00 g | 22 mm | 6.00g Au; 0.30g Ag; 0.70g Cu | reeded | 1879–1880 | |
| Half-union $50 | | | 83.58 g | 50.80 mm | 90% Au; 10% Cu (Note: Although circulation strikes of the Half Union were to be 90% gold 10% copper, only two of the twenty known pattern coins were struck with this composition. The other 18 were struck in 100% copper, although some were later plated with gold by the mint.) | reeded | 1877 | Commemorative coins of this denomination were issued in 1915. Several bullion coins are produced in this denomination. |
| Union $100 | | | unknown | unknown | 90% Au; 10% Cu | unknown | never minted | Canceled before any patterns could be minted (fantasy coin shown). Some commemorative and bullion coins are minted in this denomination. |
