= Karl Reinhardt (mathematician) =

German mathematician (1895–1941)

Karl August Reinhardt
- Born: January 27, 1895; Frankfurt am Main
- Died: April 27, 1941 (aged 46); Berlin
- Education: Goethe Univ. Frankfurt
- Known for: Hilbert's eighteenth problem; Pentagonal tiling; Reinhardt polygons; Reinhardt's conjecture; Reinhardt domains
- Scientific career
- Fields: Geometry
- Institutions: Goethe University Frankfurt; University of Greifswald
- Thesis: Über die Zerlegung der Ebene in Polygone (1918)
- Doctoral advisor: Ludwig Bieberbach

Karl August Reinhardt (27 January 1895 – 27 April 1941) was a German mathematician whose research concerned geometry, including polygons and tessellations. He solved one of the parts of Hilbert's eighteenth problem, and is the namesake of the Reinhardt domains in several complex variables, and Reinhardt polygons and the Reinhardt conjecture on packing density.

== Life ==
Reinhardt was born on January 27, 1895, in Frankfurt, the descendant of farming stock. One of his childhood friends was mathematician Wilhelm Süss. After studying at the gymnasium there, he became a student at the University of Marburg in 1913 before his studies were interrupted by World War I. During the war, he became a soldier, a high school teacher, and an assistant to mathematician David Hilbert at the University of Göttingen.

Reinhardt completed his Ph.D. at Goethe University Frankfurt in 1918. His dissertation, Über die Zerlegung der Ebene in Polygone, concerned tessellations of the plane, and was supervised by Ludwig Bieberbach. He began working as a secondary school teacher while working on his habilitation with Bieberbach, which he completed in 1921; titled Über Abbildungen durch analytische Funktionen zweier Veränderlicher, it concerned several complex variables.

Bieberbach moved to Berlin in 1921, taking Süss as an assistant. They left Reinhardt in Frankfurt, working two jobs as a high school teacher and junior faculty at the university. In 1924, Reinhardt moved to the University of Greifswald as an extraordinary professor, under the leadership of Johann Radon; this gave him an income sufficient to support himself without a second job, and afforded him more time for research. He became an ordinary professor at Greifswald in 1928.

He remained in Greifswald for the rest of his career, "with an outstanding research record and a reputation as a fine, thoughtful teacher". However, despite his now-comfortable position, his health was poor, and he died in Berlin on April 27, 1941, aged 46.

== Contributions ==
In his doctoral dissertation, Reinhardt discovered the five tile-transitive pentagon tilings. In a 1922 paper, Extremale Polygone gegebenen Durchmessers, he solved the odd case of the biggest little polygon problem, and found the Reinhardt polygons, equilateral polygons inscribed in Reuleaux polygons that solve several related optimization problems.

He had long been interested in Hilbert's eighteenth problem, a shared interest with Bieberbach, who in 1911 had solved a part of the problem asking for the classification of space groups. A second part of the problem asked for a tessellation of Euclidean space by a tile that is not the fundamental region of any group. In a 1928 paper, Zur Zerlegung der euklidischen Räume in kongeuente Polytope Reinhardt solved this part by finding an example of such a tessellation. In a later development, Heinrich Heesch showed in 1935 that tilings with this property exist even in the two-dimensional Euclidean plane.

Another of his works, Über die dichteste gitterförmige Lagerung kongruenter Bereiche in der Ebene und eine besondere Art konvexer Kurven from 1934, constructed the smoothed octagon and conjectured that, among all centrally-symmetric convex shapes in the plane, it is the one with the lowest maximum packing density. Although the packing density of this shape is worse than the density of circle packings, Reinhardt's conjecture that it is the worst possible remains unsolved.

Reinhardt also published a textbook, Methodische Einfuhrung in die Hohere Mathematik (1934). In it he presented calculus in a format reversed from the usual presentation, with areas under curves (integrals) earlier than slopes of curves (derivatives), based on his theory that the material would be easier to learn in this order.
