= Rudolf Kochendörffer =

German mathematician (1911–1980)

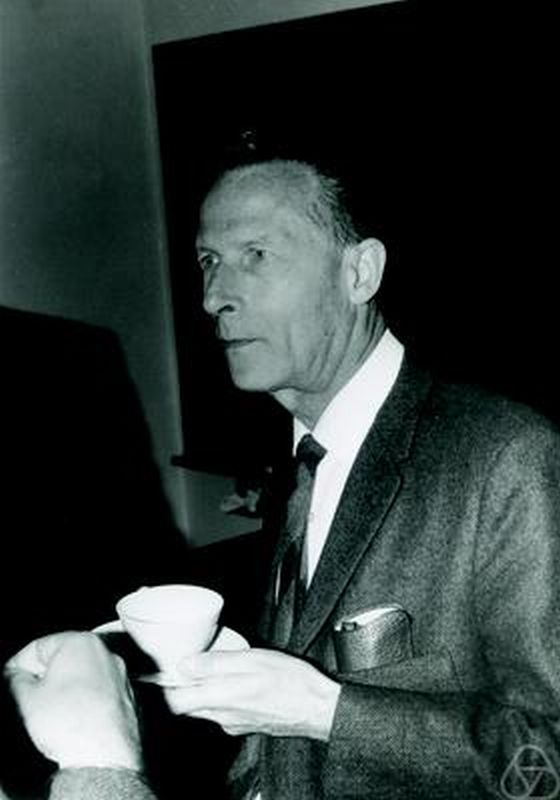
- Mathematician Kochendoerffer.jpg
- Born: 21 November 1911; Munich
- Died: 23 August 1980 (aged 68); Pankow
- Education: Humboldt University of Berlin
- Known for: Writing several textbooks on algebra and group theory. Tester of Enigma cipher machine security, and decoding of Swiss Enigma K.
- Scientific career
- Fields: algebra group theory
- Workplaces: University of Göttingen; Technische Universität Berlin; Humboldt University of Berlin; University of Rostock; Johannes Gutenberg University of Mainz; University of Tasmania; Gesellschaft für Angewandte Mathematik und Mechanik; Mathematical Reviews; Zentralblatt MATH
- Doctoral advisor: Issai Schur; Erhard Schmidt; Ludwig Bieberbach
- Doctoral students: Lothar Berg; Fritz Rühs [de]

Rudolf Paul Joachim Kochendörffer (21 November 1911 in Pankow – 23 August 1980 in Dortmund) was a German mathematician and professor of mathematics in the University of Rostock specialising in algebra, group theory and theory of finite groups and their representation. During World War II, Kochendörffer worked as a mathematical cryptanalyst in the mathematical referat of Inspectorate 7/IV, that would later become part of Referat I of Group IV of the General der Nachrichtenaufklärung (abbr. GDNA), the signals intelligence agency of the Wehrmacht and was known as a cryptographic tester of the Enigma cipher machine. Kochendörffer was a Member of the Scientific Advisory Council for Mathematics at the State Secretariat for the Higher and Specialist Schools of the GDR, a staff member of Mathematical Reviews and collaborated with the Zentralblatt MATH

== Life ==
Rudolf Kochendörffer's father, Albert Kochendörffer(1877-1958) was a lending bookseller (German: Leihbuchhändler). His mother was Bertha Kochendörffer.

== Education ==
In 1930, Kochendörffer completed his Abitur. Kochendörffer subsequently studied at the Technische Hochschule in Charlottenburg (now Technische Universität Berlin) from 1930 to 1936 on the study of mathematics, physics and philosophy.

== Career ==
In 1936, he was promoted to Dr Phil, with a doctoral thesis titled: Investigations on a presumption of W. Burnside (German:Untersuchungen über eine Vermutung von W. Burnside) (Burnside's theorem). His doctoral advisors where Ludwig Bieberbach, Issai Schur and Erhard Schmidt. He was forced to resign as a Jew in 1935. During 1938-1939 he worked as an assistant at the University of Göttingen.

During the war Kochendörffer worked as a cryptanalyst, from 1939 to 1942 as an assistant in the cryptanalysis department Pers Z S of the Foreign Office and from 1942-1945 in the OKW/Chi and the GDNA. He documented the breaking of the Swiss Enigma K machine and was part of the team, with Hans-Peter Luzius and Willi Rinow, that broke the M-209 code.

From 1946 to 1948 Kochendörffer worked as a Senior assistant at the Mathematical Institute of the Humboldt University of Berlin. In 1948, Kochendörffer habilitated in the subjects of mathematics in Berlin, and was promoted to full professor. He then appointed to position as professor of mathematics at the University of Greifswald, for a year.

In 1950, Kochendörffer became a professor of Mathematics at the University of Rostock, a position he held until 1966.Kochendörffer specialized in group theory. He was also published algebra textbooks. Between 1967-1970 Kochendörffer was visiting professor of Mathematics, Faculty of Natural Sciences at the Johannes Gutenberg University of Mainz, and at the University of Tasmania. Between 1970-1977, Kochendörffer finished his career as professor of Mathematics at TU Dortmund University.

He was a member of the Mathematische Gesellschaft der DDR, German Mathematical Society and the member of Gesellschaft für Angewandte Mathematik und Mechanik.

== Awards and honours ==
In 1960, he was awarded the Patriotic Order of Merit in Bronze, which was recognized in 1967. In 1963 he received the National Prize of the German Democratic Republic, National Prize III. for science and technology.

== Publications ==
- Einführung in die Algebra. Berlin 1955, 4. Aufl. 1974. (English Edition: Introduction to algebra. Groningen 1972).
- Determinants and matrices (German:Determinanten und Matrizen). Leipzig 1957, 5. Aufl. 1967. (License Issue Stuttgart 1970).
- Lehrbuch der Gruppentheorie. Unter besonderer Berücksichtigung der endlichen Gruppen. Leipzig 1966. (English Edition: Textbook of the group theory with special consideration of the finite groups. Leipzig 1966, English Group Theory, McGraw Hill 1970).
- On supplements of finite groups. Groningen 1963.
