= Ring cent =

United States pattern coin

Ring Cent
- United States
- Value: 1¢ (0.01 United States dollar)
- Edge: Various edge designs
- Composition: Various compositions (billon was to be standard)
- Years of minting: 1850–1851, 1853 (restrikes dated 1850), 1883–1885
- Catalog number: -

Obverse
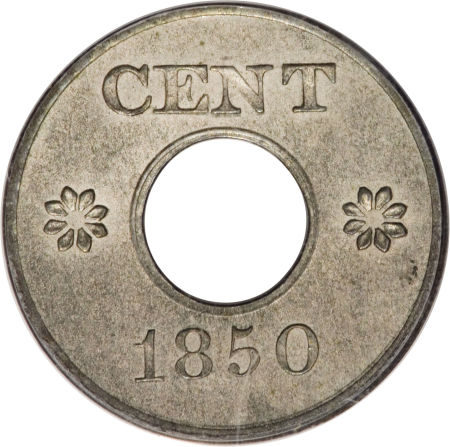
- Designer: Unknown
- Design date: 1850

Reverse
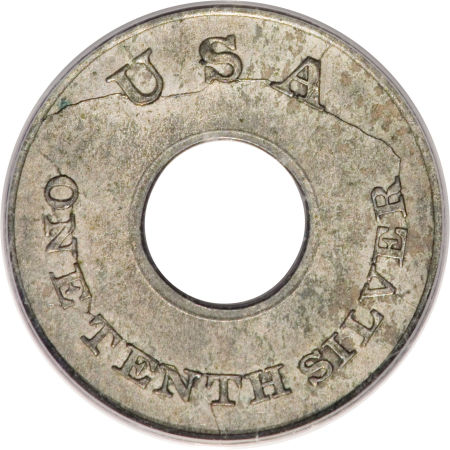
- Designer: Unknown
- Design date: 1850

The ring cent or holey cent was a one-cent pattern coin first struck in various compositions and designs between 1850 and 1851 as part of an experiment on producing a cent with a reduced weight and diameter, as the rising price of copper had caused cents to cost more than their face value to produce. Many varieties exist, with differing designs as well as differing compositions, including billon (standard), aluminum, copper, cupronickel, nickel silver, nickel, silver, and white metal.

== History ==
In the late 1840s, the price of copper had risen to the point that large cents cost more than one cent to produce. In response to a bill drafted in 1849 by Congressman Samuel F. Vinton to reduce the size of the cent, the US mint began looking for an alternative type of cent. One solution to the problem was to perforate the coin in the center, creating a ring-like appearance.

Pattern ring cents were first struck in 1850 in various test compositions. However, it was found that the coin was difficult to eject from the presses and that it was expensive to recover the silver from the alloy. Because of this, the ring cent was not placed into mass-production and the large cent continued to be produced until 1857, when it was replaced by the Flying Eagle cent. According to numismatic historian Walter Breen, another factor in the rejection of the ring cent was that it reminded many of the Chinese cash coin, which had minimal purchasing value.

The ring cent was briefly revived in 1884 by Eastman Johnson, although this time the design was somewhat cruder as the holes appeared to have been handcut as they vary in both size and shape. Although a more refined and smoother design was struck the following year, no more ring cents would ever be struck. 196 ring cents (originals and restrikes) are known to exist.

== Other versions ==
Patterns of this "ring cent" were struck in various metals and with various hole sizes. There were also various different designs, with some designs lacking a date or a reverse design. Some did not even have a hole, in its place being a circle resembling a line for perforation. These were known as annular cents.

== Ring cent obverse designs ==
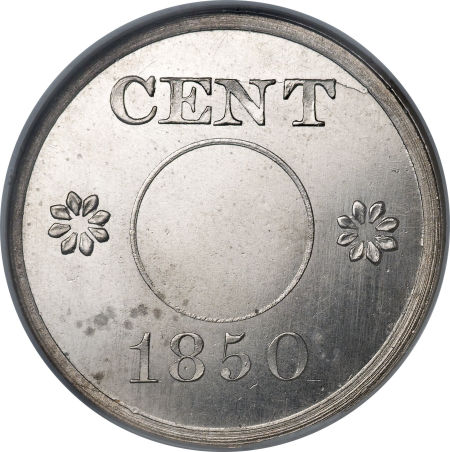
1850 non-perforated obverse

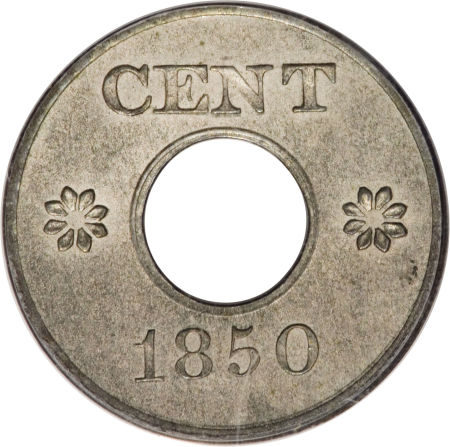
1850 perforated obverse

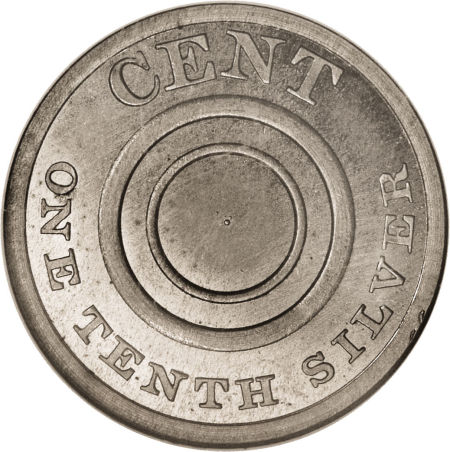
1851 non-perforated obverse

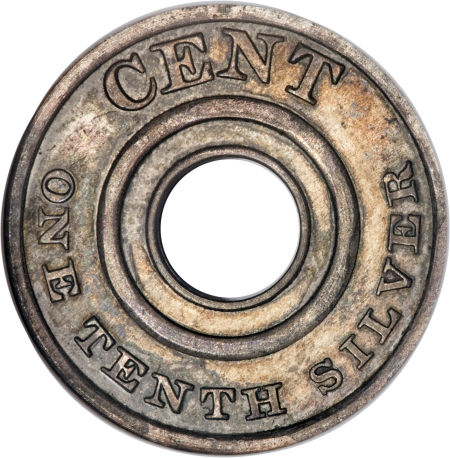
1851 perforated obverse

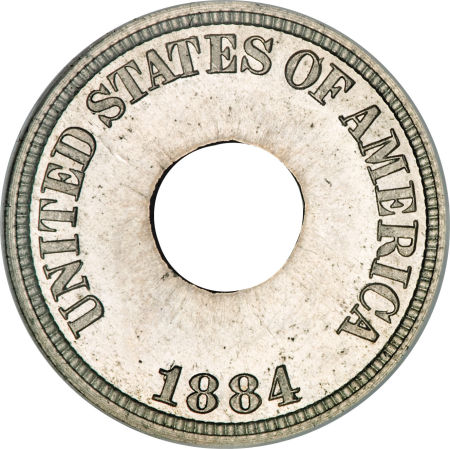
Obverse of the 1884 Eastman Johnson cent

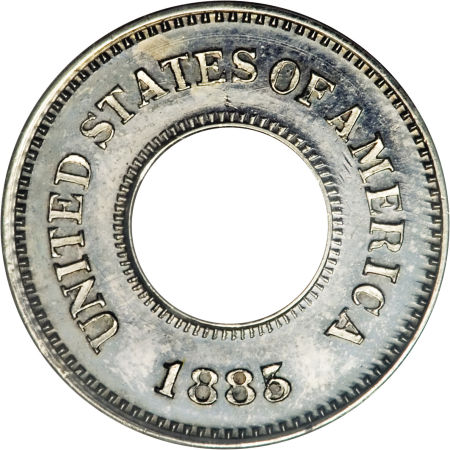
Obverse of the 1885 ring cent.

All 1885 ring cents (with and without the hole) were struck with a die featuring a 5 over 3 overdate error.

== Ring cent reverse designs ==
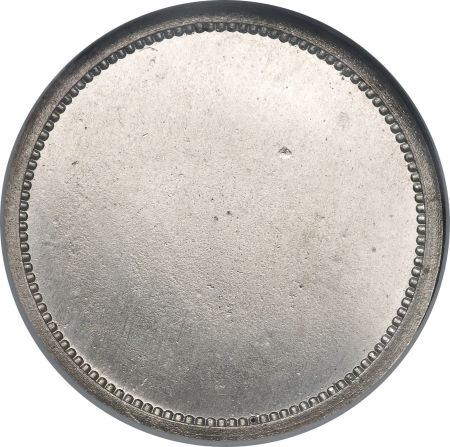
1850 blank non-perforated reverse (1853 restrikes only)

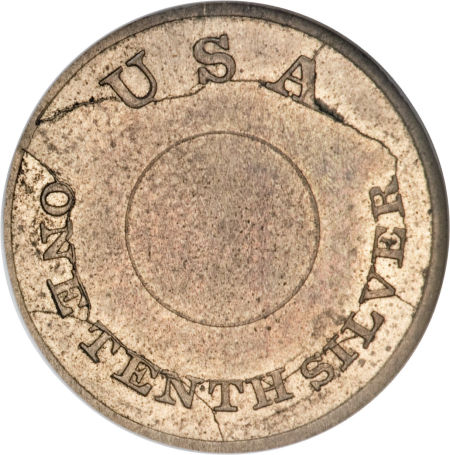
1850 non-perforated reverse

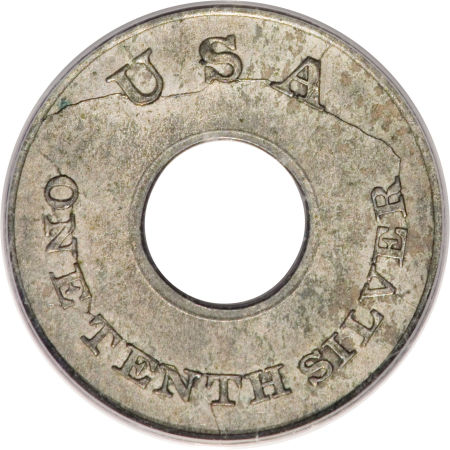
1850 perforated reverse

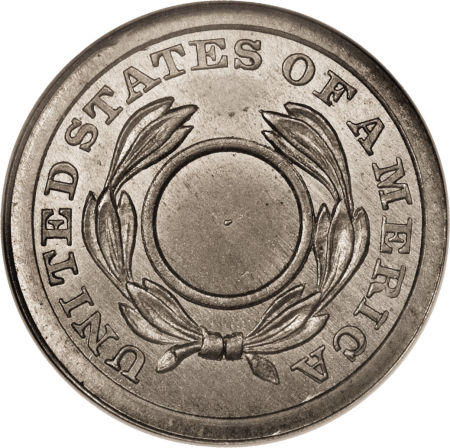
1851 non-perforated reverse

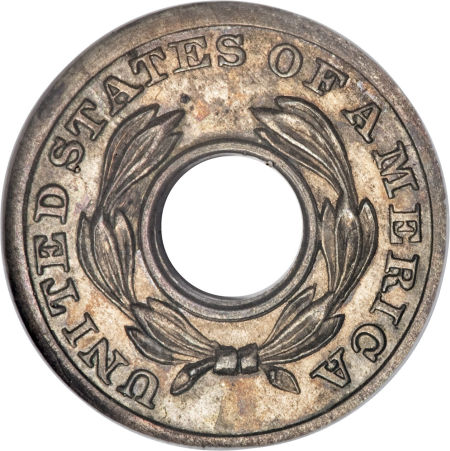
1851 perforated reverse

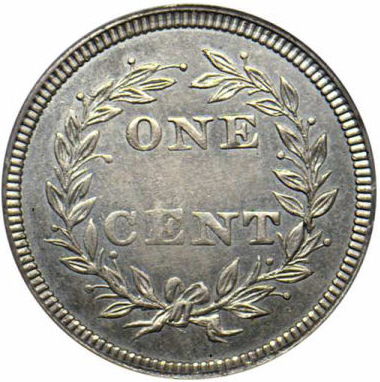
1850 non-perforated reverse, with the denomination surrounded by a wreath

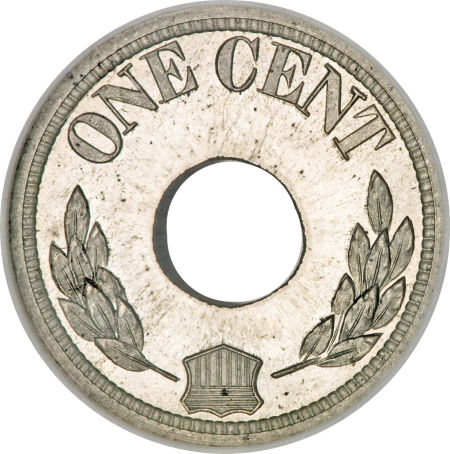
Reverse of the 1884 Eastman Johnson cent

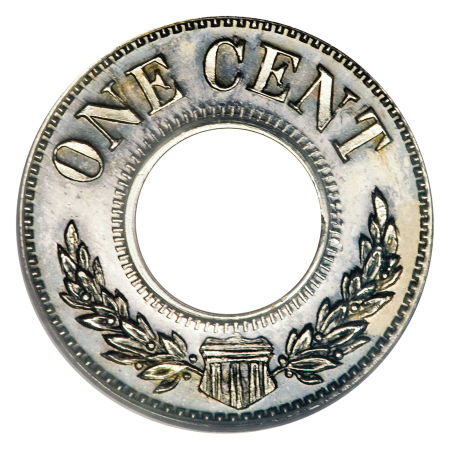
Reverse of the 1885 ring cent.

The 1850 blank non-perforated reverse was probably struck from the same die that was used for an 1852 gold dollar pattern.

In the case of the 1850 non-perforated reverse with the denomination surrounded by a wreath, although they were dated 1850 (and thus used the 1850 non-perforated reverse), the coins were actually struck in 1853.

== See also ==
- Flying Eagle cent
- Silver center cent
- Two-cent billon
- Three-cent bronze
- Stella (United States coin)
- 1943 steel cent
- 1974 aluminum cent
- Holed coin
- Ring nickel
