= Matthes =

Matthes is a German surname. Notable people with the surname include:

- Agneta Matthes (1847–1909), Dutch entrepreneur
- Heinrich Matthes (1902–1978), German SS-Scharführer
- Josef Friedrich Matthes (1886–1943), head of the Rhenish Republic
- Klaus Matthes (1931–1998), German mathematician
- Lothar Matthes (1947–2025), German diver
- Marion Charles Matthes (1906–1980), United States federal judge
- Michael Matthes, French organist
- Paul Matthes (1879–1948), German footballer
- Roland Matthes (1950–2019), German backstroke swimmer
- Ruthie Matthes (born 1965), American bicycle racer
- Sven Matthes (born 1969), German sprinter
- Ulrich Matthes (born 1959), German actor

== See also ==
- Matthes Crest
- Matthes Langhoff
