= Reinhardt polygon =

Polygon with many longest diagonals

Four 15-sided Reinhardt polygons (yellow), inscribed in Reuleaux polygons (curved black outer boundaries). The diameters are shown as blue line segments within each polygon.

In geometry, a Reinhardt polygon is a convex polygon in which the triangles formed from each edge and the farthest point from the edge are all congruent and isosceles. The sides of these isosceles triangles form the farthest pairs of its vertices (its diameters) and include every vertex of the polygon. Reinhardt polygons may be constructed from certain Reuleaux polygons, curves of constant width made up of circular arcs of constant radius, by subdividing and straightening the arcs of a Reuleaux polygon into equal-length line segments.

The number of sides of a Reinhardt polygon can be any positive integer that is not a power of two. For any odd number $n$, the regular $n$-gon is a Reinhardt polygon. There is only one shape of Reinhardt $n$-gon when $n$ is either a prime number or twice a prime number, but for other values there are multiple different Reinhardt $n$-gons. A formula counts the Reinhardt $n$-gons with rotational symmetry, but many Reinhardt polygons are asymmetric.

Among all polygons with $n$ sides, the Reinhardt polygons have the largest possible perimeter for their diameter, the largest possible width for their diameter, and the largest possible width for their perimeter. They are named after Karl Reinhardt, who studied them in 1922.

== Definition and construction ==
A Reuleaux polygon is a convex shape with circular-arc sides, each centered on a vertex of the shape and all having the same radius; an example is the Reuleaux triangle. If the sides of a Reuleaux polygon can be partitioned into arcs of equal lengths, then replacing these equal-length arcs by line segments forms a Reinhardt polygon. It is an equilateral polygon (its sides have equal lengths), the convex hull of the endpoints of the equal-length arcs, and is inscribed in the Reuleaux polygon. The underlying Reuleaux polygon is a curve of constant width, but the Reinhardt polygon formed from it is not, because it has straight sides instead of curved arcs as sides. The vertices of the Reinhard polygon may include both vertices of the underlying Reuleaux polygon, and additional points where the Reuleaux polygon's arcs have been subdivided.

If $n$ is a power of two, then it is not possible to form a Reinhardt polygon with $n$ sides. If $n$ is an odd number, then the regular polygon with $n$ sides is a Reinhardt polygon. Every natural number $n$ that is not a power of two has an odd divisor $d \ge 3$, from which a Reinhardt polygon with $n$ sides may be formed by subdividing each arc of a regular $d$-sided Reuleaux polygon into $n/d$ smaller arcs. Therefore, the possible numbers of sides of Reinhardt polygons are the polite numbers, numbers that are not powers of two. When $n$ is an odd prime number, or two times a prime number, there is only one shape of $n$-sided Reinhardt polygon, but all other values of $n$ have Reinhardt polygons with multiple shapes.

== Dimensions and optimality ==
The diameter pairs of a Reinhardt polygon form many isosceles triangles with the sides of the triangle, with apex angle $\pi/n$, from which the dimensions of the polygon may be calculated. If the side length of a Reinhardt polygon is 1, then its perimeter is just $n$. The diameter of the polygon (the longest distance between any two of its points) equals the side length of these isosceles triangles, $1/2\sin(\pi/2n)$. The width of the polygon (the shortest distance between any two parallel supporting lines) equals the height of this triangle, $1/2\tan(\pi/2n)$. These polygons are optimal in three ways:

- They have the largest possible perimeter among all $n$-sided polygons with their diameter, and the smallest possible diameter among all $n$-sided polygons with their perimeter.
- They have the largest possible width among all $n$-sided polygons with their diameter, and the smallest possible diameter among all $n$-sided polygons with their width.
- They have the largest possible width among all $n$-sided polygons with their perimeter, and the smallest possible perimeter among all $n$-sided polygons with their width.

The relation between perimeter and diameter for these polygons was proven by Reinhardt, and rediscovered independently multiple times. The relation between diameter and width was proven by Bezdek and Fodor in 2000; their work also investigates the optimal polygons for this problem when the number of sides is a power of two (for which Reinhardt polygons do not exist).

== Symmetry and enumeration ==
The $n$-sided Reinhardt polygons formed from $d$-sided regular Reuleaux polygons are symmetric: they can be rotated by an angle of $2\pi/d$ to obtain the same polygon. The Reinhardt polygons that have this sort of rotational symmetry are called periodic, and Reinhardt polygons without rotational symmetry are called sporadic. If $n$ is a semiprime (the product of two prime numbers), or the product of a power of two with an odd prime power, then all $n$-sided Reinhardt polygons are periodic. In the remaining cases, when $n$ has at least two distinct odd prime factors and is not semiprime, sporadic Reinhardt polygons also exist.

For each $n$, there are only finitely many distinct $n$-sided Reinhardt polygons. If $p$ is the smallest prime factor of $n$, then the number of distinct $n$-sided periodic Reinhardt polygons is
$$\frac{p2^{n/p}}{4n}\bigl(1+o(1)\bigr),$$
where the $o(1)$ term uses little O notation. However, the number of sporadic Reinhardt polygons is less well-understood, and for most values of $n$ the total number of Reinhardt polygons is dominated by the sporadic ones.

Number of $n$-sided periodic Reinhardt polygons (sequence A374832 in the OEIS):

$n$:	3	4	5	6	7	8	9	10	11	12	13	14	15	16	17	18	19	20	21	22	23	24
#:	1	0	1	1	1	0	2	1	1	2	1	1	5	0	1	5	1	2	10	1	1	12

Number of $n$-sided sporadic Reinhardt polygons (sequence A373695 in the OEIS):

$n$:	30	42	45	60	63	66	70	75	78	84
#:	3	9	144	4392	1308	93	27	153660	315	161028

== See also ==
- Biggest little polygon, the polygons maximizing area for their diameter
