= Kaiserin-Augusta-Gymnasium =

School in Charlottenburg, Berlin, Germany

The Kaiserin-Augusta-Gymnasium was a German school based in Charlottenburg, a locality of Berlin. It started in 1818 as a private school, founded by Ludwig Cauer. In 1869, it expanded and became a gymnasium. In 1876 it was named after Empress Augusta, wife of William I. After World War II it merged with the Mommsen-Gymnasium. A new building was erected in 1956 and a new name was given, Erich-Hoepner-Gymnasium after Erich Hoepner. Since 2008, the name of the school is Heinz-Berggruen-Gymnasium after Heinz Berggruen.

== Notable alumni ==
- Hermann Brück
- Max Weber
- Wilhelm Cauer
- Ernst August Weiß
