= Ludwig Bieberbach =

German mathematician (1886–1982)

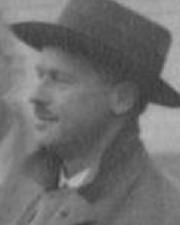
- 1930 at Jena
- Born: 4 December 1886; Goddelau, Grand Duchy of Hesse, German Empire
- Died: 1 September 1982 (aged 95); Oberaudorf, Upper Bavaria, West Germany
- Education: University of Göttingen; University of Heidelberg
- Known for: Fatou–Bieberbach domain Bieberbach conjecture Bieberbach's inequality Bieberbach's theorems
- Scientific career
- Fields: Mathematics
- Workplaces: University of Berlin; University of Frankfurt
- Doctoral advisor: Felix Klein
- Doctoral students: Hubert Cremer [de] Werner Fenchel; Hans Freudenthal; Helmut Grunsky; Maximilian Herzberger; Heinz Hopf; Rudolf Kochendörffer; Karl Reinhardt; Willi Rinow; Kurt Schröder [de] Wilhelm Süss; Johann Friedrich Schultze

Ludwig Georg Elias Moses Bieberbach (German: [ˈbiːbɐbax]; 4 December 1886 – 1 September 1982) was a German mathematician, who achieved early success solving the first part of Hilbert's eighteenth problem; he is best known for formulating the Bieberbach conjecture. He was also a leading representative of National Socialist German mathematics ("Deutsche Mathematik").

== Biography ==
Ludwig Bieberbach was born 4 December 1886 in Goddelau, near Darmstadt. His mother, Karoline Ludwig, was the daughter of Georg Ludwig, the director of the Heppenheim State Asylum. His father, Eberhard Sebastian Bieberbach (1848-1893), was a physician and later director of the same asylum.

Bieberbach studied at Heidelberg and under Felix Klein at Göttingen, receiving his doctorate in 1910. His dissertation was titled On the theory of automorphic functions (German: Theorie der automorphen Funktionen). He began working as a Privatdozent in 1910, at first with Ernst Zermelo at the University of Zurich, and soon after with Arthur Schoenflies at Königsberg.

Bieberbach wrote a habilitation thesis in 1911 about groups of Euclidean motions – identifying conditions under which the group must have a translational subgroup whose vectors span the Euclidean space – that helped solve Hilbert's 18th problem.

Bieberbach was appointed Professor ordinarius at the University of Basel in 1913. He moved to the University of Frankfurt in 1915. In 1916 he formulated the Bieberbach conjecture, stating a necessary condition for a holomorphic function to map the open unit disc injectively into the complex plane in terms of the function's Taylor series. In 1984 Louis de Branges proved the conjecture (for this reason, the Bieberbach conjecture is sometimes called de Branges's theorem).

He taught at the University of Berlin from 1921–45. He worked on complex analysis and its applications to other areas in mathematics. He is known for his work on dynamics in several complex variables, where he obtained results similar to Fatou's. There is also a Bieberbach theorem on space groups. In 1928 Bieberbach wrote a book with Issai Schur titled Über die Minkowskische Reduktiontheorie der positiven quadratischen Formen.

Bieberbach was a speaker at the International Congress of Mathematicians held at Zurich in 1932.

== Politics ==
Bieberbach joined the Sturmabteilung in 1933 and the NSDAP in 1937. He was enthusiastically involved in the efforts to dismiss his Jewish colleagues, including Edmund Landau and his former coauthor Issai Schur, from their posts. He also facilitated the Gestapo arrests of some close colleagues, such as Juliusz Schauder. Bieberbach was heavily influenced by Theodore Vahlen, another German mathematician and anti-Semite, who along with Bieberbach founded the "Deutsche Mathematik" ("German mathematics") movement and journal of the same name. The purpose of the movement was to encourage and promote a "German" (in this case meaning intuitionistic) style in mathematics. For example, Bieberbach claimed that "the Cauchy–Goursat theorem arouses intolerable displeasure" in Germans, and was representative of an abstract style of reasoning and "pronounced shrewdness" characteristic of "Jewish mathematics". Bieberbach's and Vahlen's idea of German mathematics was part of a wider trend in the scientific community in Nazi Germany towards giving the sciences racial character; there were also pseudoscientific movements for "Deutsche Physik", "German chemistry", and "German biology".

In 1945, Bieberbach was dismissed from all his academic positions because of his support of Nazism, but in 1949 was invited to lecture at the University of Basel by Ostrowski, who considered Bieberbach's political views irrelevant to his contributions to mathematics.

== See also ==
- Bieberbach conjecture
- Bieberbach groups
- Angle trisection
- Periodic graph (geometry)
- Topological rigidity
