= Hopf–Rinow theorem =

Gives equivalent statements about the geodesic completeness of Riemannian manifolds

The Hopf–Rinow theorem is a set of statements about the geodesic completeness of Riemannian manifolds. It is named after Heinz Hopf and his student Willi Rinow, who published it in 1931. Stefan Cohn-Vossen extended part of the Hopf–Rinow theorem to the context of certain types of metric spaces.

== Statement ==
Let $(M, g)$ be a connected and smooth Riemannian manifold without boundary. Then the following statements are equivalent:

1. The closed and bounded subsets of $M$ are compact;
2. $M$ is a complete metric space;
3. $M$ is geodesically complete; that is, for every $p \in M,$ the exponential map exp_{p} is defined on the entire tangent space $\mathrm{T}_p M.$

Furthermore, any one of the above implies that given any two points $p, q \in M,$ there exists a length-minimizing geodesic connecting these two points (geodesics are in general critical points for the length functional, and may or may not be minima).

In the Hopf–Rinow theorem, the first characterization of completeness deals purely with the topology of the manifold and the boundedness of various sets; the second deals with the existence of minimizers to a certain problem in the calculus of variations (namely minimization of the length functional); the third deals with the nature of solutions to a certain system of ordinary differential equations.

== Variations and generalizations ==
- The Hopf–Rinow theorem is generalized to length-metric spaces the following way:
  - If a length-metric space is complete and locally compact then any two points can be connected by a minimizing geodesic, and any bounded closed set is compact.

In fact these properties characterize completeness for locally compact length-metric spaces.

- The theorem does not hold for infinite-dimensional manifolds. The unit sphere in a separable Hilbert space can be endowed with the structure of a Hilbert manifold in such a way that antipodal points cannot be joined by a length-minimizing geodesic. It was later observed that it is not even automatically true that two points are joined by any geodesic, whether minimizing or not.
- The theorem also does not generalize to Lorentzian manifolds: the Clifton–Pohl torus provides an example (diffeomorphic to the two-dimensional torus) that is compact but not complete.
