= Deutsche Mathematik =

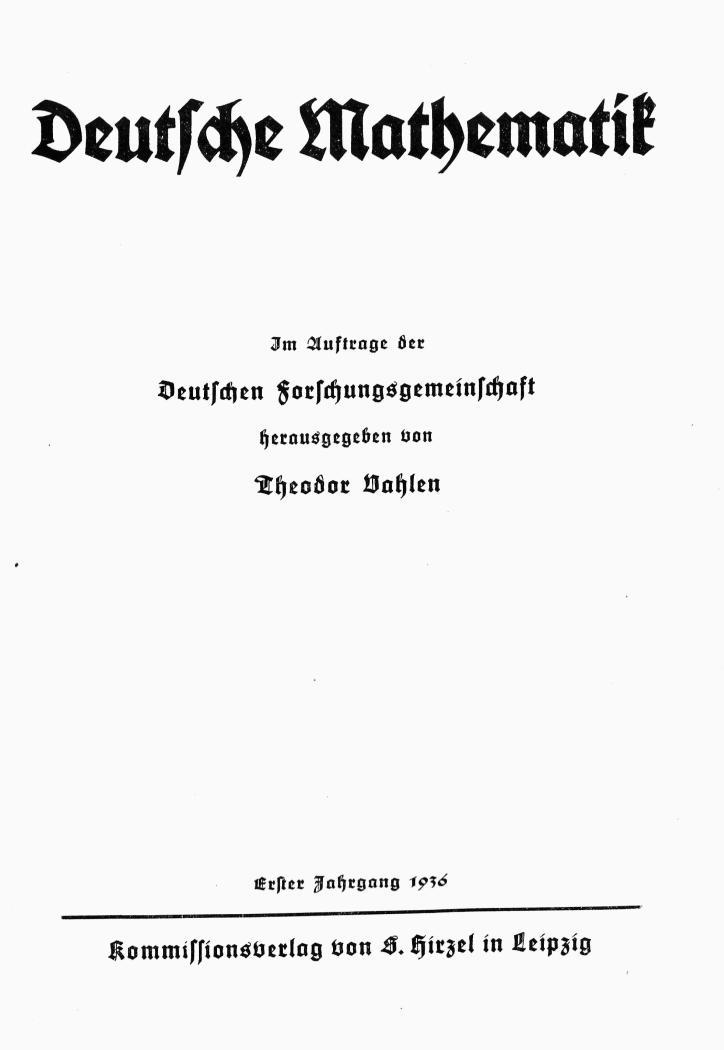
- Discipline: Mathematics, Nazi propaganda
- Language: German
- Edited by: Ludwig Bieberbach

Publication details
- History: 1936 – 1944
- Publisher: Theodor Vahlen; Publishing house: S. Hirzel (Leipzig)
- Frequency: bi-monthly (delays in volumes 6–7)

Standard abbreviations
- ISO 4: Dtsch. Math.

Deutsche Mathematik (German Mathematics) was a mathematics journal founded in 1936 by Ludwig Bieberbach and Theodor Vahlen. Vahlen was publisher on behalf of the German Research Foundation (DFG), and Bieberbach was chief editor. Other editors were Fritz Kubach, Erich Schönhardt, Werner Weber (all volumes), Ernst August Weiß (volumes 1–6), Karl Dörge, Wilhelm Süss (volumes 1–5), Günther Schulz (de), Erhard Tornier (volumes 1–4), Georg Feigl, Gerhard Kowalewski (volumes 2–6), Maximilian Krafft, Willi Rinow, Max Zacharias (volumes 2–5), and Oswald Teichmüller (volumes 3–7). In February 1936, the journal was declared the official organ of the German Student Union (DSt) by its Reichsführer, and all local DSt mathematics departments were requested to subscribe and actively contribute. In the 1940s, issues appeared increasingly delayed and bunched; the journal ended with a triple issue (due Dec 1942) in June 1944.

Deutsche Mathematik is also the name of a movement closely associated with the journal whose aim was to promote "German mathematics" and eliminate "Jewish influence" in mathematics, similar to the Deutsche Physik movement. As well as articles on mathematics, the journal published propaganda articles giving the Nazi viewpoint on the relation between mathematics and race (though these political articles mostly disappeared after the first two volumes). As a result of this many mathematics libraries outside Germany did not subscribe to it, so copies of the journal can be hard to find. This caused some problems in Teichmüller theory, as Oswald Teichmüller published several of his foundational papers in the journal.

== See also ==
- Mathematics in Nazi Germany
