= Ernst August Weiß =

German mathematician

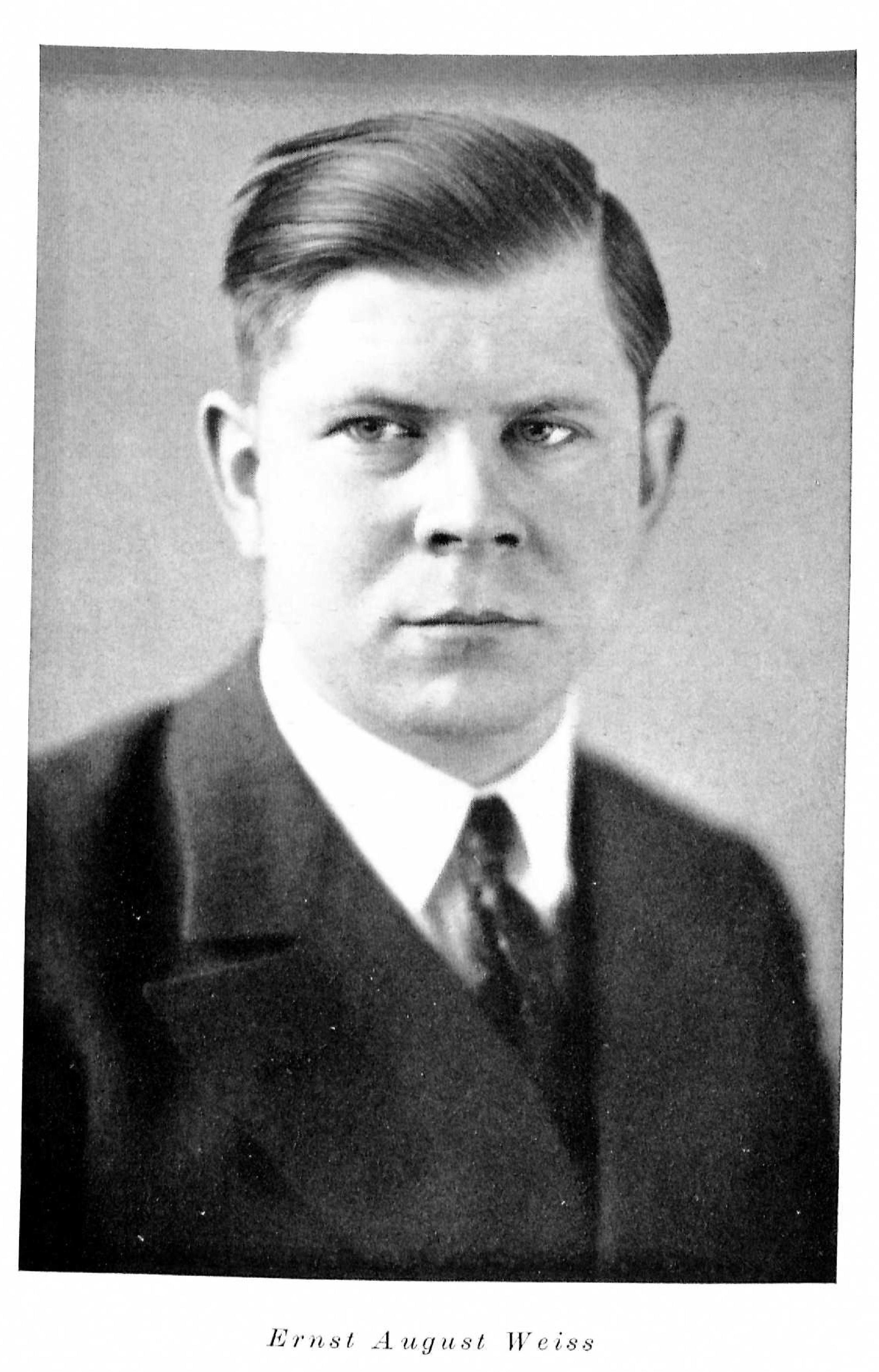
From Strubecker's obituary

Ernst August Weiß (or Weiss; 5 May 1900 in Strasbourg – 9 February 1942 in a Nazi field hospital near Lake Ilmen) was a German mathematician.

== Early life and education ==
Since 1906, he attended the Lyceum in Metz, the Luther school and (1910–1912) Schiller gymnasium in Münster, and 1912–1917 the Mommsen-Gymnasium in Berlin, where he passed the Notabitur. He volunteered for the German military engineers in World War I, participated in the attrition warfare near Reims and Soissons and was captured 26 September 1918 during the tank battle near Cheppy by American soldiers. After his release in September 1919 he studied mathematics at Leibniz University Hannover and (1920–1924) Bonn University, where he obtained a Ph.D. in March 1924 and a habilitation in May 1926. In August 1926, he married the physicist Eva Renate Bidder.

== Work in SA ==
Weiß joined an SA storm in Bonn in 1933, and got promoted up to an Obertruppführer. He directed the Bonn Studentenwerk. He created the Mathematical Work Camps ("Mathematische Arbeitslager") in Kronenburg "as a new form of mathematical university teaching and collaboration of professors and students", which took place 1—15 March 1934, 15—29 October 1934, 17 February–3 March 1935, 23 February–7 March 1936, and 17—31 October 1938. Segal (1992) examined Weiß' camps from a pedagogical point of view, "as one example of how mathematics and Nazi ideology would interact". Weiß was a permanent editor of the journal Deutsche Mathematik. A list of his publications is given in Blaschke (1942).

== Death ==
In 1941, Weiß took part in Operation Barbarossa as company commander of an engineer unit; during the Demyansk Pocket he was mortally wounded in close combat in Lukinn.

== Selected works ==
- Weiß, E. A. (1935). Einführung in die Liniengeometrie und Kinematik. Leipzig & Berlin: Teubner.
- Weiß, E. A. (1939). Punktreihengeometrie. Leipzig & Berlin: Teubner.
