= William Francis Pohl =

American mathematician

William Francis Pohl (16 September 1937 – 9 December 1988) was an American mathematician, specializing in differential geometry and known for the Clifton–Pohl torus.

Pohl received from the University of Chicago his B.A in 1957 and his M.A.1958. He completed his Ph.D. at Berkeley in 1961 under the direction of Shiing-Shen Chern with dissertation Differential Geometry of Higher Order. His dissertation was published in 1962 in the journal Topology and has received over 120 citations in the mathematical literature. He was a member of the mathematics faculty at the University of Minnesota from September 1964 until his untimely death.

Pohl engaged in a famous controversy arguing against Francis Crick but, in view of additional empirical evidence, conceded about 1979 or 1980 that Crick was correct.

Pohl sang liturgical music in Catholic religious services and wrote an article in 1966 from which the journal Sacred Music published an excerpt in 2011.

In the early 1970s, Dr. William F. Pohl, a professor of mathematics at the University of Minnesota, sang the Gregorian chant, mostly solo, while developing a small schola of Chorale volunteers to assist him. Dr. Pohl guided the chant during the aftermath of the Second Vatican Council when all the liturgical books were being revised ? no small task, but as some may recall, he was no small man.

By 1975, in cooperation with Monsignor Richard J. Schuler, pastor of Saint Agnes, and Harold Hughesdon, its master of ceremonies, Dr. Pohl, joined by a number of dedicated volunteers, had begun the custom of singing Sunday vespers weekly and the full office of Tenebrae during Holy Week.

Organist David Bevan arrived from England in 1976 to accompany the Chorale, and he assumed directorship of the Gregorian chant after Dr. Pohl's retirement in 1977.

William Pohl later married Hildegard Bastian (now Hildegard Pohl), and fathered 5 children, Annetta Pohl, Agatha Pohl, Agnes Pohl, Lawrence Pohl, and John Pohl.

== Selected publications ==
- Pohl, William F. (1966). "Connexions in differential geometry of higher order". Transactions of the American Mathematical Society. 125 (2): 310–325. doi:10.1090/s0002-9947-1966-0203628-1. JSTOR 1994357.
- "The self-linking number of a closed space curve (Gauss integral formula treated for disjoint closed space curves linking number)" (PDF). Journal of Mathematics and Mechanics. 17: 975–985. 1968.
- Pohl, William F. (1968). "Some integral formulas for space curves and their generalization". American Journal of Mathematics. 90 (4): 1321–1345. doi:10.2307/2373302. JSTOR 2373302.
- with T. F. Banchoff: Banchoff, Thomas F.; Pohl, William F. (1971). "A generalization of the isoperimetric inequality". Journal of Differential Geometry. 6 (2): 175–192. doi:10.4310/jdg/1214430403. MR 0305319.
- with John Alvord Little: Little, John A.; Pohl, William F. (1971). "On tight immersions of maximal codimension" (PDF). Inventiones Mathematicae. 13 (3): 179–204. Bibcode:1971InMat..13..179L. doi:10.1007/BF01404629. hdl:2027.42/46589. S2CID 54785966.
- with Nicolaas H. Kuiper: Kuiper, Nicolaas H.; Pohl, William F. (1977). "Tight topological embeddings of the real projective plane in E^{5} ". Inventiones Mathematicae. 42 (1): 177–199. Bibcode:1977InMat..42..177K. doi:10.1007/BF01389787. S2CID 120800935.
- Pohl, William F. (1981). "The probability of linking of random closed curves". Geometry Symposium Utrecht 1980. Lecture Notes in Mathematics. Vol. 894. Springer Berlin Heidelberg. pp. 113–126. doi:10.1007/BFb0096227. ISBN 978-3-540-11167-2.
