= Oberwolfach Research Institute for Mathematics =

German research institute

Coordinates: 48°20′44″N 8°14′07″E

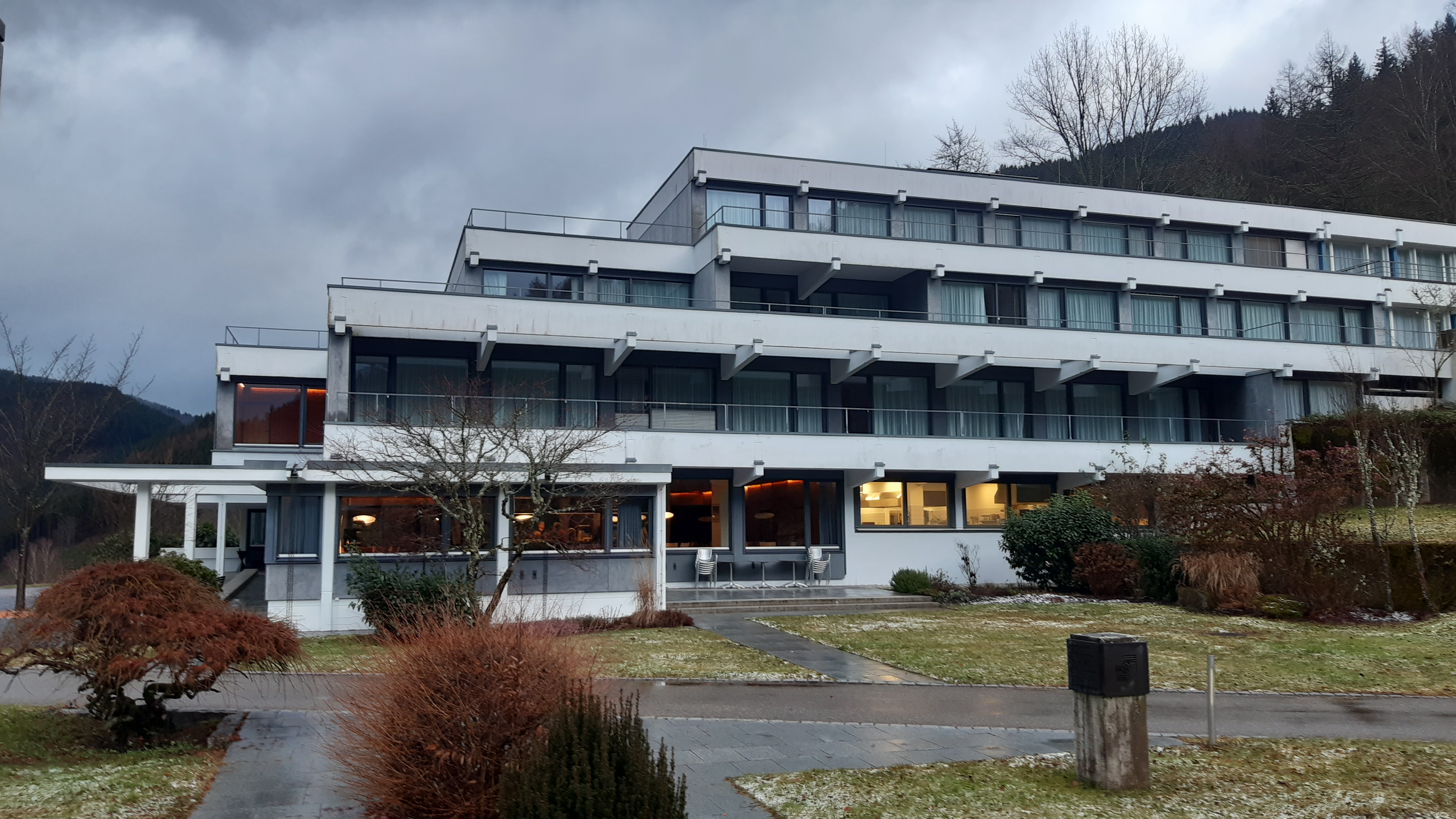
- Main building of the institute with restaurant and guest rooms
- Parent institution: Leibniz Association
- Founder: Wilhelm Süss
- Established: 1944
- Location: Oberwolfach, Baden-Württemberg, Germany
- Website: www.mfo.de

The Oberwolfach Research Institute for Mathematics (German: Mathematisches Forschungsinstitut Oberwolfach) is a center for mathematical research in Oberwolfach, Germany. It was founded by mathematician Wilhelm Süss in 1944.

It organizes weekly workshops on diverse topics where mathematicians and scientists from all over the world come to do collaborative research.

The Institute is a member of the Leibniz Association, funded mainly by the German Federal Ministry of Education and Research and by the state of Baden-Württemberg. It also receives substantial funding from the Friends of Oberwolfach foundation, from the Oberwolfach Foundation and from numerous donors.

== History ==
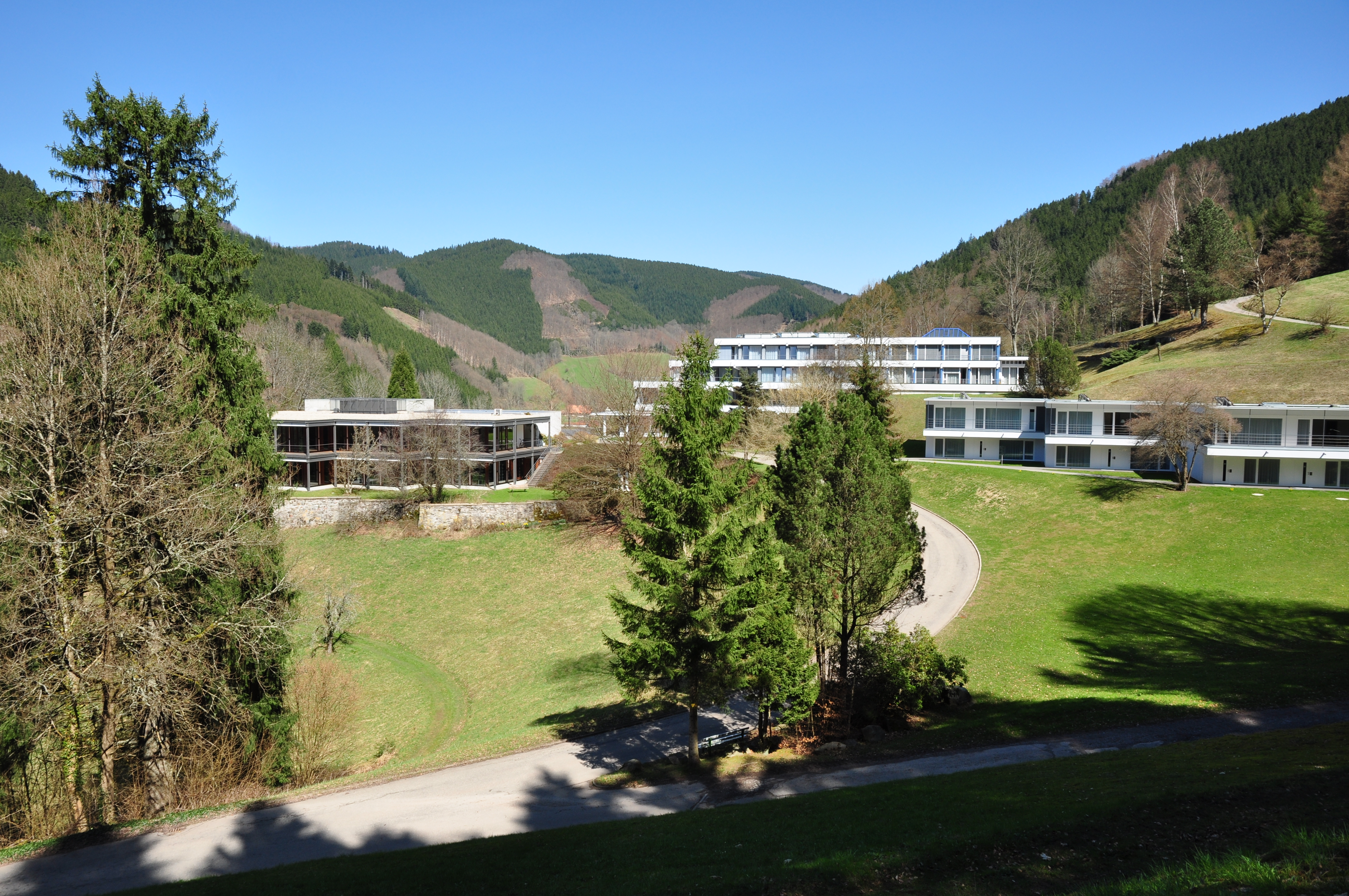
The library, the main building and the bungalows

The Oberwolfach Research Institute for Mathematics (MFO) was founded as the Reich Institute of Mathematics (German: Reichsinstitut für Mathematik) on 1 September 1944. It was one of several research institutes founded by the Nazis in order to further the German war effort, which at that time was clearly failing. The location was selected to be remote as not to be a target for Allied bombing. Originally it was housed in a building called the Lorenzenhof, a large Black Forest hunting lodge. After the war, Süss, a member of the Nazi party, was suspended for two months in 1945 as part of the county's denazification efforts, but thereafter remained head of the institute. Though the institute lost its government funding, Süss was able to keep it going with other grants, and contributed to rebuilding mathematics in Germany following the fall of the Third Reich by hosting international mathematical conferences. Some of these were organised by Reinhold Baer, a mathematician who was expelled from University of Halle in 1933 for being Jewish, but later returned to Germany in 1956 at the University of Frankfurt. The institute regained government funding in the 1950s.

After Süss's death in 1958, Hellmuth Kneser was briefly director before Theodor Schneider permanently took over in the role in 1959. In that year, he and others formed the mathematical society Gesellschaft für Mathematische Forschung e. V. in order to run the MFO.

On 10 October 1967 the guest house of the Oberwolfach Research Institute for Mathematics was inaugurated, which was a gift from the Volkswagen Foundation. On 13 June 1975 the library and meetings building of the MFO were inaugurated, replacing the old castle. This new building was also a gift from the Volkswagen Foundation.

On 26 May 1989 an extension to the guest building at the MFO was inaugurated.

In 1995, the MFO established the research program "Research in Pairs".

On 1 January 2005 Oberwolfach Research Institute for Mathematics became a member of the Leibniz Association. From 2005 to 2010, there was a general restoration of the guest house and the library building at the MFO.

Post-doctoral program "Oberwolfach Leibniz Fellows" was established in 2007. On 5 May that year an extension to the library was inaugurated, the extension was a gift from the Klaus Tschira Stiftung and the Volkswagen Foundation.

== Scientific program ==
The yearly scientific program consists of Workshops, Mini-Workshops, Oberwolfach Arbeitsgemeinschaft, Oberwolfach Seminars, and Networking Activities. In addition, the MFO hosts longer-term researchers in the form of Oberwolfach Research Fellows aimed at small groups of researchers (1-4 weeks stay) and individual postdoctoral positions, called Leibniz fellowships (4-12 weeks stay).

- Workshops are events lasting one week, consisting of 45-48 experts on a particular topic. They can also be realized as "half-workshops", which happen two-at-a-time and consist of 24 participants
- Mini-workshops are events lasting one week, consisting of 16 experts.
- Arbeitsgemeinschaft are study-group-style meetings, aimed at young researchers and non-experts. There are three per year, each lasting a week.
- Oberwolfach Seminars are organized by leading experts in the field, aimed at excellent and promising Ph.D. students and postdocs. Each morning, seminar talks are given by the organizers, while afternoons are left to interactive sessions. There are six week-long seminars per year.
- Networking Activities are workshops, half workshops, or mini-workshops with a distinguished networking character, which were introduced in 2024.

== Statue ==
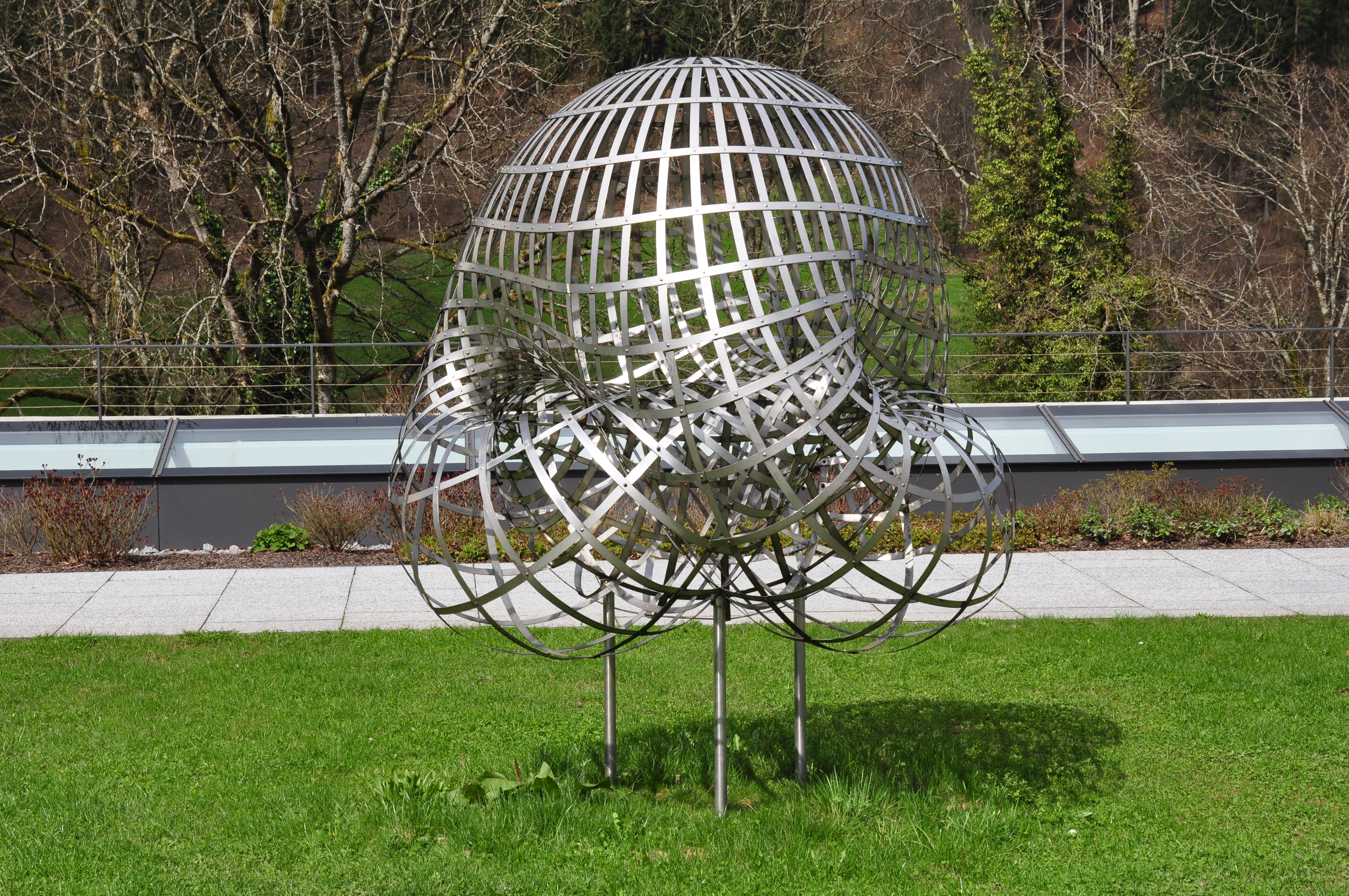
Model of a Boy's surface at the entrance

The iconic model of the Boy surface was installed in front of the Institute, as a gift from Mercedes-Benz on 28 January 1991.

The Boy Surface is named after Werner Boy who constructed the surface in his 1901 thesis, written under the direction of David Hilbert.

== Directors ==
- 1944–1958, Wilhelm Süss
- 1958–1959, Hellmuth Kneser
- 1959–1963, Theodor Schneider
- 1963–1994, Martin Barner
- 1994–2002, Matthias Kreck
- 2002–2013, Gert-Martin Greuel
- 2013–present Gerhard Huisken

== Oberwolfach Prize ==
The Oberwolfach Prize is awarded approximately every three years for excellent achievements in changing fields of mathematics to young mathematicians not older than 35 years. It is financed by the Oberwolfach Foundation and awarded in cooperation with the institute. The prize money is €10,000.

Prize winners

- 1991 Peter Kronheimer
- 1993 Jörg Brüdern and Jens Franke
- 1996 Gero Friesecke and Stefan Sauter
- 1998 Alice Guionnet
- 2000 Luca Trevisan
- 2003 Paul Biran
- 2007 Ngô Bảo Châu
- 2010 Nicola Gigli and László Székelyhidi
- 2013 Hugo Duminil-Copin
- 2016 Jacob Fox
- 2019 Oscar Randal-Williams
- 2022 Vesselin Dimitrov
- 2025 Yu Deng
