= Smoothed octagon =

Two-dimensional shape

A smoothed octagon.

The smoothed octagon is a region in the plane found by Karl Reinhardt in 1934 and conjectured by him to have the lowest maximum packing density of the plane of all centrally symmetric convex shapes. It was also independently discovered by Kurt Mahler in 1947. It is constructed by replacing the corners of a regular octagon with a section of a hyperbola that is tangent to the two sides adjacent to the corner and asymptotic to the sides adjacent to these.

== Construction ==
Construction of the smoothed octagon (black), the tangent hyperbola (red), the asymptotes of this hyperbola (green), and the tangent sides to the hyperbola (blue)

The hyperbola that forms each corner of the smoothed octagon is tangent to two sides of a regular octagon, and asymptotic to the two adjacent to these. The following details apply to a regular octagon of circumradius $\sqrt{2}$ with its centre at the point $(2+\sqrt{2},0)$ and one vertex at the point $(2,0)$. For two constants $\ell=\sqrt{2} - 1$ and $m=(1/2)^{1/4}$, the hyperbola is given by the equation
$$\ell^2x^2-y^2=m^2$$
or the equivalent parameterization (for the right-hand branch only)
$$\begin{align}
x&=\frac{m}{\ell} \cosh{t}\\
y&= m \sinh{t}\\
\end{align}$$

for the portion of the hyperbola that forms the corner, given by the range of parameter values
$$-\frac{\ln{2}}{4}<t<\frac{\ln{2}}{4}.$$

The lines of the octagon tangent to the hyperbola are $y= \pm \left(\sqrt{2} + 1 \right) \left( x-2 \right)$, and the lines asymptotic to the hyperbola are simply $y = \pm \ell x$.

== Packing ==
The family of maximally dense packings of the smoothed octagon.

As smoothed octagons rotate their centres form a triangle with varying shape but constant area.

For every centrally symmetric convex planar set, including the smoothed octagon, the maximum packing density is achieved by a lattice packing, in which unrotated copies of the shape are translated by the vectors of a lattice. The smoothed octagon achieves its maximum packing density, not just for a single packing, but for a 1-parameter family. All of these are lattice packings. The smoothed octagon has a maximum packing density given by
$$\frac{ 8-4\sqrt{2}-\ln{2} }{2\sqrt{2}-1} \approx 0.902414 \, .$$

This is lower than the maximum packing density of circles, which is
$$\frac{\pi}{\sqrt{12}} \approx 0.906899.$$

The maximum known packing density of the ordinary regular octagon is
$$\frac{4 + 4 \sqrt{2}}{5 + 4 \sqrt{2}} \approx 0.906163,$$
also slightly less than the maximum packing density of circles, but higher than that of the smoothed octagon.

== Conjectured optimality ==
Unsolved problem in mathematics
Is the smoothed octagon the centrally symmetric convex shape with the lowest maximum packing density?
More unsolved problems in mathematics

Reinhardt's conjecture that the smoothed octagon has the lowest maximum packing density of all centrally symmetric convex shapes in the plane remains unsolved. However, Thomas Hales and Koundinya Vajjha claimed to have proved a weaker conjecture, which asserts that the most unpackable centrally symmetric convex disk must be a smoothed polygon. Additionally, Fedor Nazarov provided a partial result by proving that the smoothed octagon is a local minimum for packing density among centrally symmetric convex shapes.

If central symmetry is not required, the regular heptagon is conjectured to have even lower packing density, but neither its packing density nor its optimality have been proven. In three dimensions, Ulam's packing conjecture states that no convex shape has a lower maximum packing density than the ball.
