= Clifton–Pohl torus =

In geometry, the Clifton–Pohl torus is an example of a compact Lorentzian manifold that is not geodesically complete. While every compact Riemannian manifold is also geodesically complete (by the Hopf–Rinow theorem), this space shows that the same implication does not generalize to pseudo-Riemannian manifolds. It is named after Yeaton H. Clifton and William F. Pohl, who described it in 1962 but did not publish their result.

== Definition ==
Consider the manifold $\mathrm{M} = \mathbb{R}^2 \smallsetminus \{0\}$ with the metric

$$g= \frac{2\,dx\,dy}{x^2+y^2}=\frac{dx\otimes dy + dy\otimes dx}{x^2+y^2}$$

Any homothety is an isometry of $M$, in particular including the map:

$$\lambda(x,y)=(2x, 2y)$$

Let $\Gamma$ be the subgroup of the isometry group generated by $\lambda$. Then $\Gamma$ has a proper, discontinuous action on $M$. Hence the quotient $T = M/\Gamma$, which is topologically the torus, is a Lorentz surface that is called the Clifton–Pohl torus. Sometimes, by extension, a surface is called a Clifton–Pohl torus if it is a finite covering of the quotient of $M$ by any homothety of ratio different from $\pm 1$.

== Geodesic incompleteness ==
It can be verified that the curve

$$\sigma(t) := \left(\frac 1 {1-t},0\right)$$

is a null geodesic of M that is not complete (since it is not defined at $t=1$). Consequently, $M$ (hence also $T$) is geodesically incomplete, despite the fact that $T$ is compact. Similarly, the curve

$$\sigma(t) := (\tan(t), 1)$$

is also a null geodesic that is incomplete. In fact, every null geodesic on $M$ or $T$ is incomplete.

The geodesic incompleteness of the Clifton–Pohl torus is better seen as a direct consequence of the fact that $(M,g)$ is extendable, i.e. that it can be seen as a subset of a bigger Lorentzian surface. It is a direct consequence of a simple change of coordinates. With

$$N =\left(-\pi/2,\pi/2\right)^2 \smallsetminus \{0\};$$

consider

$$F : N \to M$$
$$F(u,v) := (\tan(u),\tan(v)).$$

The metric $F^*g$ (i.e. the metric $g$ expressed in the coordinates $(u,v)$) reads

$$\widehat{g\,} =\frac{du\,dv}{\tfrac{1}{2}(\cos(u)^2\sin(v)^2+\sin(u)^2\cos(v)^2)}.$$

But this metric extends naturally from $N$ to $\mathbb R^2 \smallsetminus \Lambda$, where

$$\Lambda =\left\{\tfrac \pi 2 (k,\ell)\ \mid\ (k,\ell)\in \mathbb Z^2, k+\ell\equiv 0 \pmod 2 \right\}.$$

The surface $(\mathbb R^2 \smallsetminus \Lambda, \widehat{g\,})$, known as the extended Clifton–Pohl plane, is geodesically complete.

== Conjugate points ==
The Clifton–Pohl tori are also remarkable by the fact that they were the first known non-flat Lorentzian tori with no conjugate points. The extended Clifton–Pohl plane contains a lot of pairs of conjugate points, some of them being in the boundary of $(-\pi/2,\pi/2)^2$ i.e. "at infinity" in $M$. Recall also that, by Hopf–Rinow theorem no such tori exists in the Riemannian setting.
