= Complete manifold =

Riemannian manifold in which geodesics extend infinitely in all directions

In mathematics, a complete manifold (or geodesically complete manifold) M is a (pseudo-) Riemannian manifold for which, starting at any point p of M, there are straight paths extending infinitely in all directions.

Formally, a manifold $M$ is (geodesically) complete if for any maximal geodesic $\ell : I \to M$, it holds that $I=(-\infty,\infty)$. A geodesic is maximal if its domain cannot be extended.

Equivalently, $M$ is (geodesically) complete if for all points $p \in M$, the exponential map at $p$ is defined on $T_pM$, the entire tangent space at $p$.

== Hopf–Rinow theorem ==
The Hopf–Rinow theorem gives alternative characterizations of completeness. Let $(M,g)$ be a connected Riemannian manifold and let $d_g : M \times M \to [0,\infty)$ be its Riemannian distance function.

The Hopf–Rinow theorem states that $(M,g)$ is (geodesically) complete if and only if it satisfies one of the following equivalent conditions:

- The metric space $(M,d_g)$ is complete (every $d_g$-Cauchy sequence converges),
- All closed and bounded subsets of $M$ are compact.

== Examples and non-examples ==
Euclidean space $\mathbb{R}^n$, the sphere $\mathbb{S}^n$, and the tori $\mathbb{T}^n$ (with their natural Riemannian metrics) are all complete manifolds.

All compact Riemannian manifolds and all homogeneous manifolds are geodesically complete. All symmetric spaces are geodesically complete.

=== Non-examples ===
The punctured plane $\mathbb R^2 \backslash \{(0,0)\}$ is not geodesically complete because the maximal geodesic with initial conditions $p = (1,1)$, $v = (1,1)$ does not have domain $\mathbb R$.

A simple example of a non-complete manifold is given by the punctured plane $\mathbb{R}^2 \smallsetminus \lbrace 0 \rbrace$ (with its induced metric). Geodesics going to the origin cannot be defined on the entire real line. By the Hopf–Rinow theorem, we can alternatively observe that it is not a complete metric space: any sequence in the plane converging to the origin is a non-converging Cauchy sequence in the punctured plane.

There exist non-geodesically complete compact pseudo-Riemannian (but not Riemannian) manifolds. An example of this is the Clifton–Pohl torus.

In the theory of general relativity, which describes gravity in terms of a pseudo-Riemannian geometry, many important examples of geodesically incomplete spaces arise, e.g. non-rotating uncharged black-holes or cosmologies with a Big Bang. The fact that such incompleteness is fairly generic in general relativity is shown in the Penrose–Hawking singularity theorems.

== Extendibility ==
If $M$ is geodesically complete, then it is not isometric to an open proper submanifold of any other Riemannian manifold. The converse does not hold.
