= Hilbert's eighteenth problem =

On lattices and sphere packing in Euclidean space

Hilbert's eighteenth problem is one of the 23 problems set out in a celebrated list compiled in 1900 by mathematician David Hilbert. It asks three separate questions on the space group in $n$-dimensional Euclidean space, anisohedral tiling in three-dimensional Euclidean space, and the densest sphere packing in Kepler conjecture. Respectively, these questions were answered affirmatively by Ludwig Bieberbach, Karl Reinhardt, and Thomas Callister Hales.

== First question: symmetry groups in n dimensions ==
The first question in Hilbert's problem asks whether there are only finitely many essentially different space groups in $n$-dimensional Euclidean space. Here, a space group or crystallographic group is the symmetry group of a repeating pattern in space, usually in three dimensions, with its symmetry operation as the rigid transformations of the pattern that leave it unchanged.

This question was answered affirmatively by Ludwig Bieberbach. Named as Bieberbach group, Bieberbach proved that the subgroup of translations of any such group contains $n$ linearly independent translations, and is a free abelian subgroup of finite index, and is also the unique maximal normal abelian subgroup. Bieberbach also showed that, in any dimension $n$, there are only a finite number of possibilities for the isomorphism class of the underlying group of a space group, and the action of the group on Euclidean space is moreover unique up to conjugation by affine transformations.

== Second question: anisohedral tiling in three dimensions ==
Two views of the three-dimensional polyhedron (one lying flat, the other on the side) as interpreted from Reinhardt's 1928 booklet

Two-dimensional plane by Heesch's anisohedral partial tile

The second question in Hilbert's problem asks whether there exists a polyhedron in three-dimensional Euclidean space that tiles but not the fundamental region of any space group. In other words, the second problem asked which tiles, but does not admit an isohedral (tile-transitive) tiling. Such tiles are not equivalent under any symmetry of the tiling, which are now known as anisohedral. Posing the problem in three dimensions, Hilbert probably assumed that no such tile exists in two dimensions; this assumption later proved to be incorrect.

Such a three dimensions polyhedron was found by Karl Reinhardt in his 1928 booklet titled Zur Zerlegung der euklidischen Räume in kongruente Polytope. The first example in two dimensions was found by Heinrich Heesch in 1935.

The einstein problem, where "einstein" means "one stone" in German's word play, is the natural extension of Hilbert's eighteenth problem's second question. The problem asks for a shape that can tile space but not with an infinite cyclic group of symmetries. Equivalently, it asks the existence of a single prototile that forms an aperiodic set, a shape that can tessellate space but only in a non-periodic way. It was solved in 2024 by David Smith and his colleagues.

== Third question: densest sphere packing ==
The third question in Hilbert's problem asks for the densest sphere packing or packing of other specified shapes. Although it expressly includes shapes other than spheres, it is generally taken as equivalent to the Kepler conjecture. The conjecture was named after 17th-century German mathematician Johannes Kepler in his booklet titled Strena, seu, de Nieu Sexangula. It states that the packing of equal volume spheres has a density greater than the packing of the face-centered cubic arrangement. Such a density is
$$\frac{\pi}{3\sqrt{2}} = 0.74048.$$

In 1998, American mathematician Thomas Callister Hales gave a computer-aided proof of the Kepler conjecture. It shows that the most space-efficient way to pack spheres is in a pyramid shape.
