= Willi Rinow =

German mathematician

Willi Ludwig August Rinow
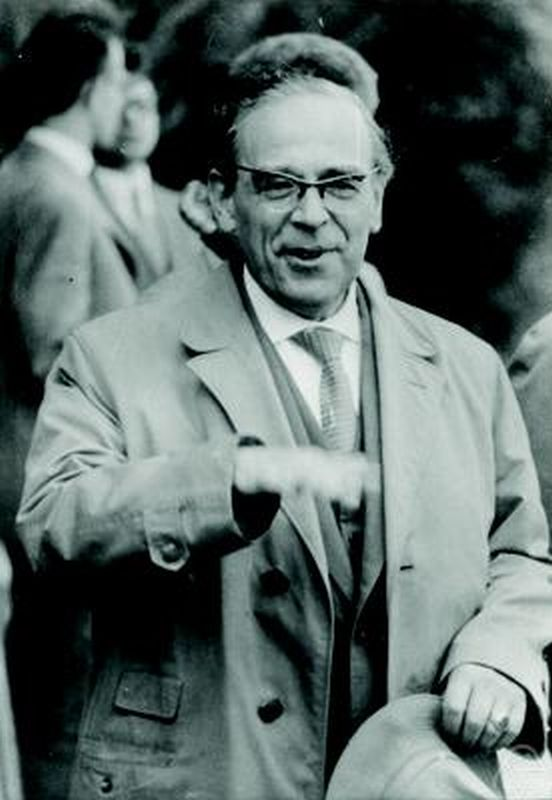
- Willi Rinow in Greifswald in 1960
- Born: 28 February 1907; Berlin, Prussia, German Empire
- Died: 29 March 1979 (aged 72); Greifswald, East Germany
- Education: Universität Berlin
- Known for: Hopf–Rinow theorem
- Scientific career
- Fields: Mathematics
- Workplaces: University of Greifswald
- Thesis: Über Zusammenhänge zwischen der Differentialgeometrie im Großen und im Kleinen (1932)
- Doctoral advisor: Heinz Hopf; Ludwig Bieberbach
- Doctoral students: Jürgen Eichhorn; Jürgen Flachsmeyer; Dietrich Kölzow; Klaus Matthes; Günter Porath; Frank Terpe

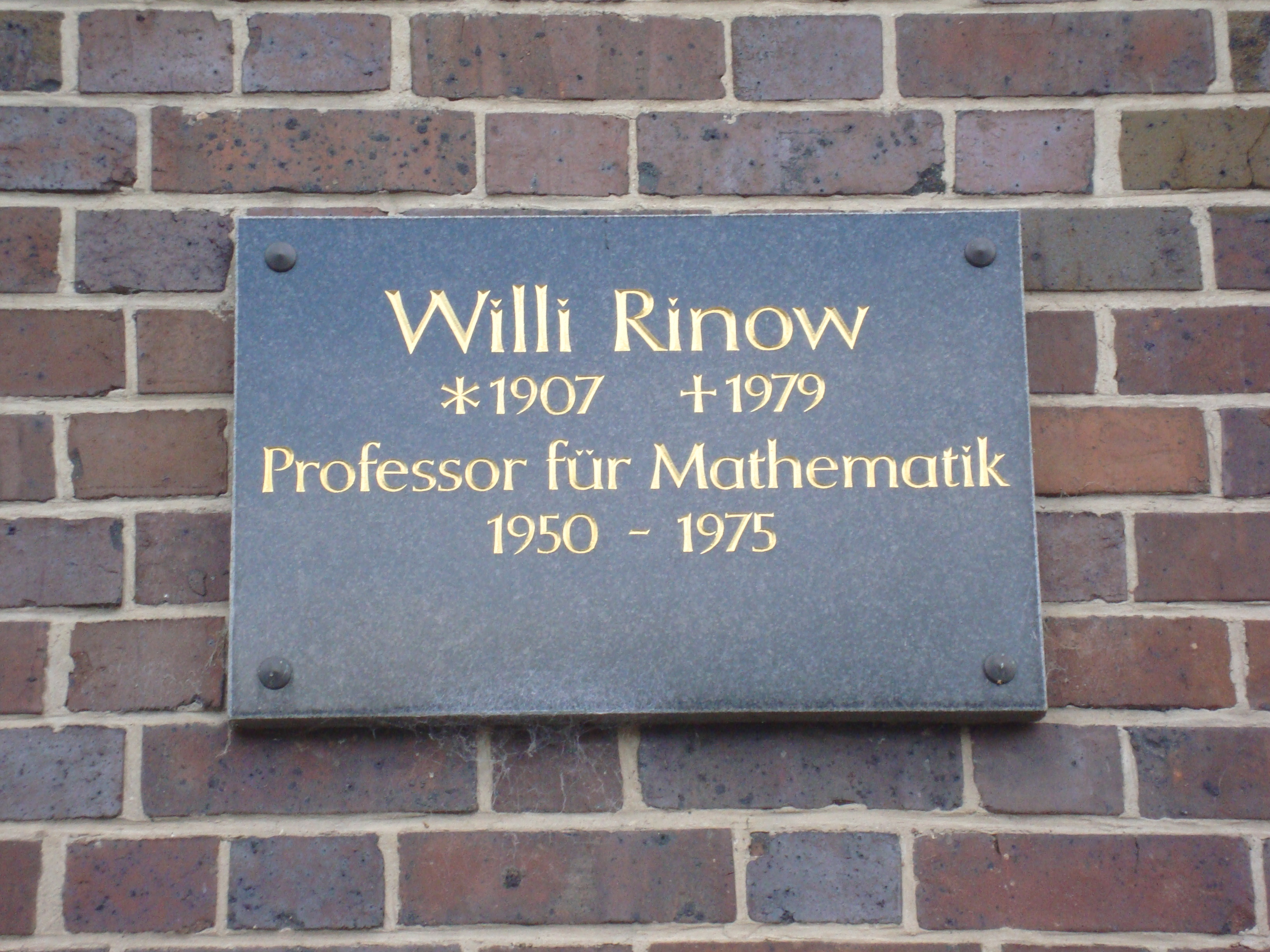
Plaque for Willi Rinow on Friedrich-Ludwig-Jahn Street in Greifswald

Willi Ludwig August Rinow (February 28th, 1907 in Berlin – March 29th, 1979 in Greifswald) was a German mathematician who specialized in differential geometry and topology. Rinow was the son of a schoolteacher. In 1926, he attended the Humboldt University of Berlin, studying mathematics and physics under professors such as Max Planck, Ludwig Bieberbach, and Heinz Hopf. There, he received his doctorate in 1931 (Über Zusammenhänge zwischen der Differentialgeometrie im Großen und im Kleinen, Math. Zeitschrift volume 35, 1932, page 512). In 1933, he worked at the Jahrbuch über die Fortschritte der Mathematik in Berlin. In 1937, he joined the Nazi Party. During 1937—1940, he was an editor of the journal Deutsche Mathematik. In 1937, he became a professor in Berlin and lectured there until 1950. His lecturing was interrupted because of his work as a mathematician at the Oberspreewerk in Berlin (a producer of radio and telecommunications technology) from 1946 to 1949.

In 1950, he became a professor at the University of Greifswald. He retired in 1972.

The Hopf–Rinow theorem is named after Hopf and Rinow.

In 1959, he became the director of the Institute for Pure Mathematics at the German Academy of Sciences at Berlin and president of the German Mathematical Society.

== War work ==
During World War II, Rinow worked as a cryptanalyst in Subsection F of Referat I of Group IV of the Inspectorate 7/VI, that was later called the General der Nachrichtenaufklärung (GdNA), achieving the rank of Colonel. Rinow worked on researching methods to solve foreign ciphers. Rinow was subordinated to Herbert von Denffer who was Director of the section and subordinated to Hans Pietsch who was Director of the section. Major Rudolf Hentze was head of the group. Otto Buggisch who was a cryptanalyst who working in the GdNA and earlier the OKW/Chi and was interrogated by TICOM agents after the war, stated that Rinow was one of the most capable people in the unit.

== Publications ==
- Die innere Geometrie der metrischen Räume, Springer 1961
- Lehrbuch der Topologie, Berlin, Deutscher Verlag der Wissenschaften 1975
- Rinow Über Zusammenhänge der Differentialgeometrie im Großen und Kleinen, Mathematische Zeitschrift, volume 32, 1932, pages 512-528, Dissertation
