= Reuleaux polygon =

Constant-width curve of equal-radius arcs

A Reuleaux triangle replaces the sides of an equilateral triangle by circular arcs

Regular Reuleaux polygons

Irregular Reuleaux heptagon

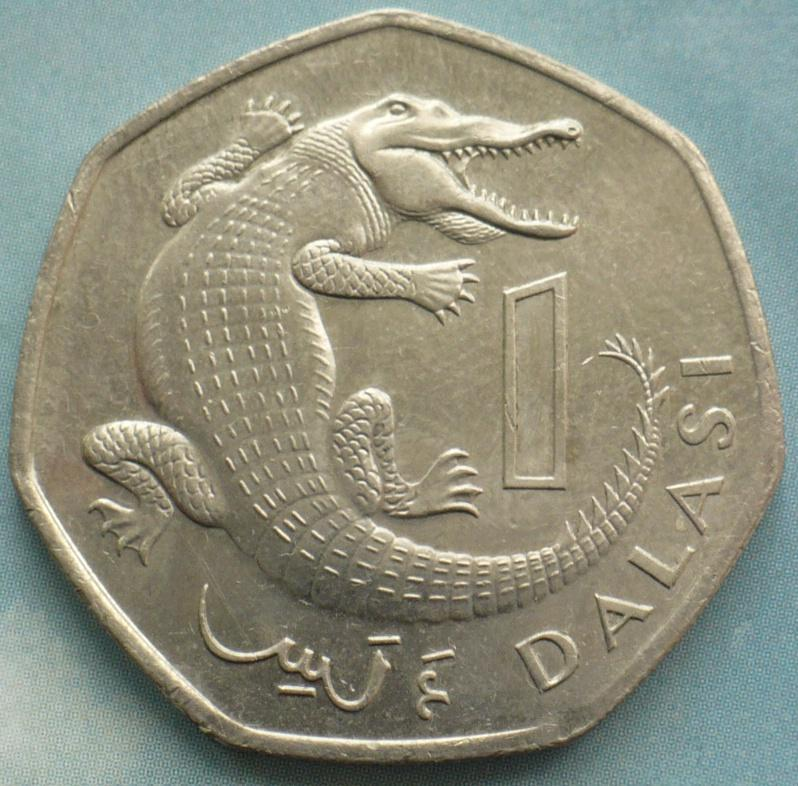
Gambian dalasi coin, a Reuleaux heptagon

In geometry, a Reuleaux polygon is a curve of constant width made up of circular arcs of constant radius. These shapes are named after their prototypical example, the Reuleaux triangle, which in turn is named after 19th-century German engineer Franz Reuleaux. The Reuleaux triangle can be constructed from an equilateral triangle by connecting each pair of adjacent vertices with a circular arc centered on the opposing vertex, and Reuleaux polygons can be formed by a similar construction from any regular polygon with an odd number of sides as well as certain irregular polygons. Every curve of constant width can be accurately approximated by Reuleaux polygons. They have been applied in coinage shapes.

== Construction ==
If $P$ is a convex polygon with an odd number of sides, in which each vertex is equidistant to the two opposite vertices and closer to all other vertices, then replacing each side of $P$ by an arc centered at its opposite vertex produces a Reuleaux polygon. As a special case, this construction is possible for every regular polygon with an odd number of sides.

Every Reuleaux polygon must have an odd number of circular-arc sides, and can be constructed in this way from a polygon, the convex hull of its arc endpoints. However, it is possible for other curves of constant width to be made of an even number of arcs with varying radii.

== Properties ==
The Reuleaux polygons based on regular polygons are the only curves of constant width whose boundaries are formed by finitely many circular arcs of equal length.

Every curve of constant width can be approximated arbitrarily closely by a (possibly irregular) Reuleaux polygon of the same width.

Four 15-sided Reinhardt polygons, formed from four different Reuleaux polygons with 9, 3, 5, and 15 sides

A regular Reuleaux polygon has sides of equal length. More generally, when a Reuleaux polygon has sides that can be split into arcs of equal length, the convex hull of the arc endpoints is a Reinhardt polygon. These polygons are optimal in multiple ways: they have the largest possible perimeter for their diameter, the largest possible width for their diameter, and the largest possible width for their perimeter.

== Applications ==
The constant width of these shapes allows their use as coins that can be used in coin-operated machines. For instance, the United Kingdom has made 20-pence and 50-pence coins in the shape of a regular Reuleaux heptagon. The Canadian loonie dollar coin uses another regular Reuleaux polygon with 11 sides. However, some coins with rounded-polygon sides, such as the 12-sided 2017 British pound coin, do not have constant width and are not Reuleaux polygons.

Although Chinese inventor Guan Baihua has made a bicycle with Reuleaux polygon wheels, the invention has not caught on.
