= Klaus Matthes =

German mathematician (1931–1998)

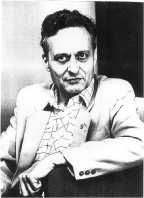
Klaus Matthes

Klaus Matthes (January 20, 1931 – March 9, 1998) was a German mathematician, known as the founder of the theory of marked and infinitely divisible point processes. From 1981 to 1991 he was the director of the GDR Academy of Sciences' Institute of Mathematics in Berlin.

== Early years ==
Matthes studied from 1948 to 1954 mathematics at Humboldt University of Berlin. He obtained his PhD from his alma mater in 1958, advised by Heinrich Grell and Kurt Schröder. In 1963 he received the habilitation, with Willi Rinow as one of the referees.

== Career ==
Matthes was employed from 1956 to 1961 as scientific assistant at Humboldt University. Then he acted as provisional director of the institute of mathematics at Ilmenau University of Technology. From 1964 to 1968 he was then full professor of mathematics at University of Jena. There he was since 1966 the dean of the mathematical-natural-scientific faculty.

In 1969 he moved to Berlin, to the Central Institute for Mathematics and Mechanics of the German Academy of Sciences, later Academy of Sciences of the German Democratic Republic (G.D.R.). From 1981 to 1991 he directed the academy institute of mathematics, which in 1985 was named „Karl-Weierstraß-Institut für Mathematik“. Thanks to the high quality of its staff, its applied part survived the big changes of the East German science system and was re-founded after the German reunification as Weierstraß-Institut für Angewandte Analysis und Stochastik (WIAS).

In 1974 Klaus Matthes was elected corresponding and in 1980 full fellow of the Academy of Sciences of the GDR. He was decorated in 1971 with the National Prize of East Germany and 1983 with the bronze Vaterländischer Verdienstorden.

== Scientific work ==
The main field of Klaus Matthes' scientific work was probability theory. He worked in particular on point processes and their application in queueing theory and branching processes.

In queueing theory he studied loss systems, e.g. the Erlang and Engset loss systems, and was the first to apply deep methods of the theory of point processes in queueing.

Klaus Matthes can be seen as the father of the theory of marked infinitely divisible point processes. He was, together with Johannes Kerstan and Joseph Mecke, the leader of the East German school of point process theory, which later found successful applications in other fields, e.g. in stochastic geometry.

In the context of limit theorems for superpositions of point processes he came to the problem of infinite divisibility of point processes (following a suggestion by Boris Vladimirovich Gnedenko). Together with his coworkers he investigated systematically the structure of infinitely divisible distributions, which culminated in the monograph "Infinitely Divisible Point Processes".

Closely related are spatial branching processes, which he studied until the end of his life. A central problem here were equilibrium distributions and their structure.

Matthes initiated the today prestigious ″Euler lectures″ in Sanssouci near Potsdam.

== Personal life ==
Klaus Matthes was married with the stage producer Gisela Matthes, née Weisse, and he was father of two sons.

== Bibliography (selection) ==
- Stationäre zufällige Punktfolgen, I.. In: Jahresberichte der Deutschen Mathematiker-Vereinigung. Vol. 66. 1963, pp. 66–79, ISSN 0012-0456
- Stationäre zufällige Punktfolgen, II.. In: Jahresberichte der Deutschen Mathematiker-Vereinigung. Vol. 66. 1963, pp. 106–118, ISSN 0012-0456
- Verallgemeinerungen der Erlangschen und Engsetschen Formeln. Akademie-Verlag Berlin, 1967 (as coauthor)
- Verallgemeinerungen eines Satzes von Dobruschin I. In: Mathematische Nachrichten. Vol. 47. 1970, pp. 183–244. ISSN 0025-584X (as coauthor)
- Verallgemeinerungen eines Satzes von Dobruschin III. In: Mathematische Nachrichten. Vol. 50. 1971, pp. 99–139. ISSN 0025-584X (as coauthor)
- Einführung in die Bedienungstheorie. München 1971 (as coauthor)
- Unbegrenzt teilbare Punktprozesse. Akademie-Verlag Berlin. 1974. Series: Mathematische Lehrbücher und Monographien; Vol. 27 (as coauthor)
- Infinitely divisible Point Processes. John Wiley & Sons, Chichester, 1978. Series: Wiley Series in Probability and Mathematical Statistics. (as coauthor)
- Equilibrium Distributions of Branching Processes. Akademie-Verlag Berlin, und Kluwer Academic Publishers, Dordrecht, Boston, London, 1988. Series: Mathematical Research; 42. ISBN 3-05-500453-1 (as coauthor)
- Equilibrium Distributions of Age Dependent Galton Watson Processes I. In: Mathematische Nachrichten. Vol. 56. 1992, pp. 233–267. ISSN 0025-584X (as coauthor)
- Equilibrium distributions of age-dependent Galton Watson processes II. In: Mathematische Nachrichten. Vol. 160. 1993, pp. 313–324. ISSN 0025-584X (as coauthor)
- Recurrence of ancestral Lines and Offspring Trees in Time stationary branching Populations. Berlin 1994 (as coauthor)

== Literature ==
- Dietrich Stoyan: Obituary: Klaus Matthes. In: Journal of Applied Probability. 36(4)/1999. Applied Probability Trust, pp. 1255–1257, ISSN 0021-9002
- Short biography with photo
