= Wilhelm Süss =

German mathematician (1895–1958)

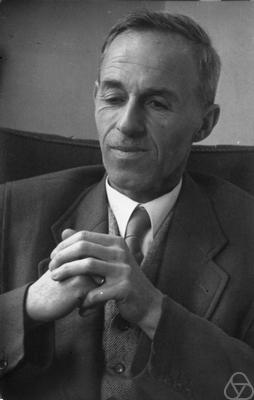
- Wilhelm Süss, ca. 1954
- Born: 7 March 1895; Frankfurt, German Empire
- Died: 21 May 1958 (aged 63); Freiburg im Breisgau, West Germany
- Education: Goethe University Frankfurt
- Known for: Founder of the Oberwolfach Research Institute for Mathematics
- Spouse: Irmgard Deckert
- Scientific career
- Workplaces: University of Greifswald; University of Freiburg
- Thesis: Begründung der Inhaltslehre im Raum ohne Benutzung von Stetigkeitsaxiomen (1922)
- Doctoral advisor: Ludwig Bieberbach

Wilhelm Süss (7 March 1895 – 21 May 1958) was a German mathematician. He was founder and first director of the Oberwolfach Research Institute for Mathematics.

== Biography ==
He was born in Frankfurt, Germany, and died in Freiburg im Breisgau, West Germany.

Süss earned a Ph.D. degree in 1922 from Goethe University Frankfurt, for a thesis written under the direction of Ludwig Bieberbach. In 1928, he took a lecturing position at the University of Greifswald, and in 1934 he became a Professor at the University of Freiburg.

Wilhelm Süss was a member of the Nazi Party and the National Socialist German Lecturers League; he joined Stahlhelm to avoid being automatically enrolled in Sturmabteilung but later he, with all Stahlhelm members, became members of Sturmabteilung. The extent to which he worked with Nazis or only cooperated as little as possible is a matter of debate among historians.

In 1936–1940, he was an editor of the journal Deutsche Mathematik.
