= Coinage shapes =

Coins by shape

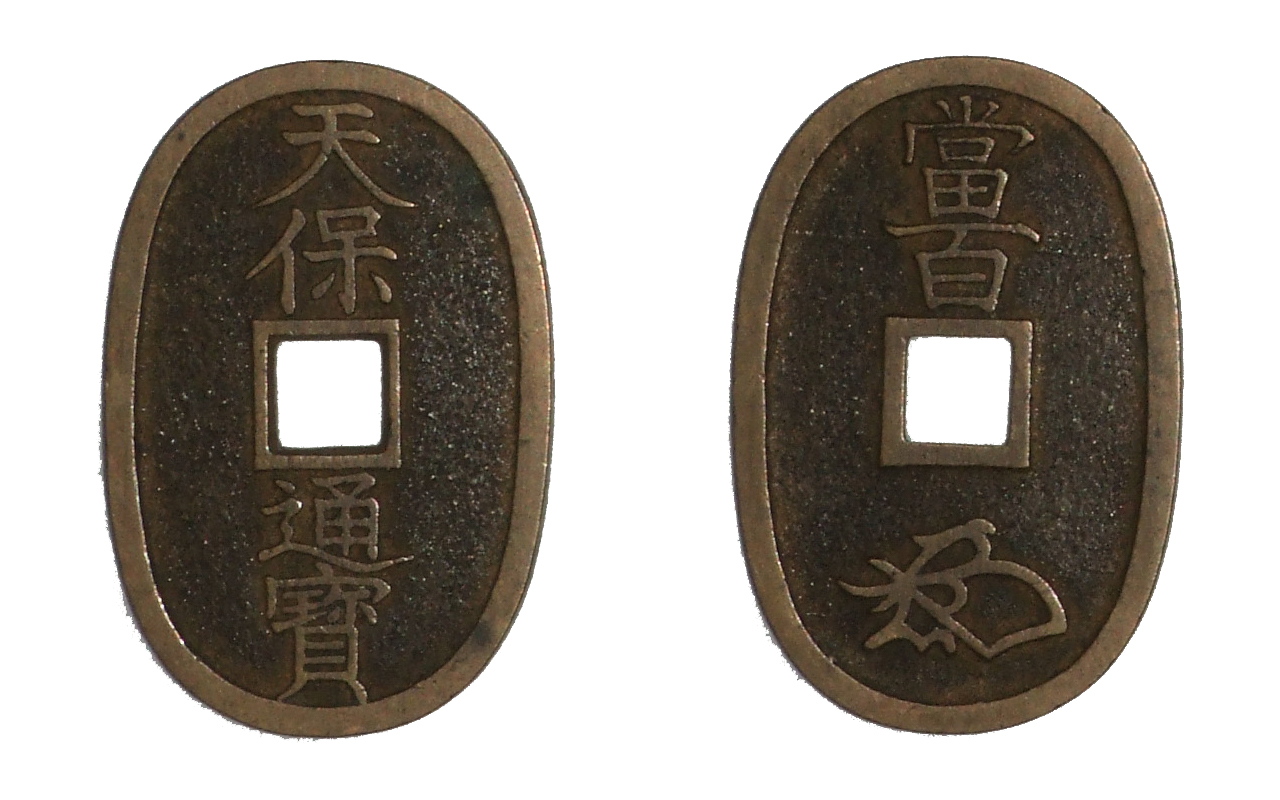
The Tenpō Tsūhō, a Japanese coin from the 19th-century.

Although the vast majority of coins are circular due to their origin as flattened pieces of metal forged between tongs, coins are made in a variety of other shapes, including squares, diamonds, hexagons, heptagons, octagons, decagons, and dodecagons. They have also been struck with scalloped (wavy) edges, and with holes in the middle. Coins in the shape of polygons often have rounded edges or are Reuleaux polygons.

This article focuses mainly on circulating coins; a number of non-circulating commemorative coins have been made in special shapes, including guitars, pyramids, and maps. There is a list with more unusual shapes of non-circulating commemorative coins at the end of this page that all have been issued officially by various countries.

== Triangular ==
The Cook Islands have a circulating 2 dollar triangular coin with rounded corners.

A triangular coin with a face value of £5 was commissioned by the Isle of Man to commemorate the 2007–2008 Tutankhamun exhibition at The O2 Arena in London. It became legal tender on 6 December 2007, but it was rarely used because each coin cost £15 to purchase from the Isle of Man Post Office.

Other triangular coins issued earlier include: Cabinda coin, Bermuda coin, Uganda Millennium Coin and Polish Sterling-Silver 10-Zloty Coin.

== Squares and diamonds ==
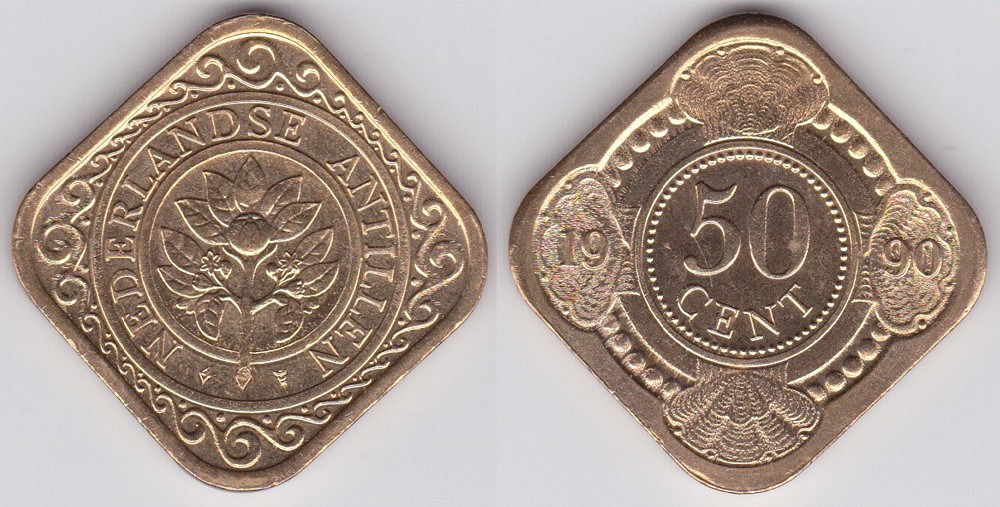
50 cent coin from the Netherlands Antilles.

Indo-Greek coins were often square. Aruba has a large circulating square 50 cents coin.

Many countries have struck square coins with rounded corners. Some of these, such as the Netherlands zinc 5 cent coin of World War II (1941–1943) and the Bangladesh 5 poisha coin (1977–1994) are oriented as a square, while others, such as the Netherlands 5 cents (1913–1940), the Netherlands Antilles 50 cent, the Bangladesh 5 poisha (1973–1974) and the 1981 Jersey 1 pound coin, are oriented as a diamond. Ceylon (the current Sri Lanka) issued its first square coin in 1909, followed by several others. India has had various circulating square coins as well, like denominated 1/2 and 2 anna coins, as well as 1 and 5 paisa coins.

Siege money, such as klippe coins or the siege money of Newark, was often in the shape of a lozenge (rhombus).

== Pentagonal ==
The Mutawakkilite Kingdom of Yemen introduced pentagonal 1/16 and 1/8 rial coins in 1948. In 2014 Transnistria was the next country to issue a circulating pentagonal 5 rubles hard plastic coin.

== Hexagonal ==
The Belgian Congo had a hexagonal 2 franc coin, as did the Kingdom of Egypt (2 piastres, also known as 2 qirsh). India used to have 3 paise and 20 paise coins that were hexagonal with rounded corners. The Burmese 25 pyas is scalloped hexagonal.

== Heptagonal ==
The Madagascar 10 ariary coin is seven-sided. The British twenty pence and fifty pence coins are heptagonal Reuleaux polygons, as is the United Arab Emirates 50 fils coin, the Barbados one dollar coin, and several coins from Botswana. Many countries in the Commonwealth of Nations have issued heptagonal coins. Reuleaux polygons have constant width, which means the currency detectors in coin-operated machines do not need an extra mechanism to detect shape.

== Octagonal ==
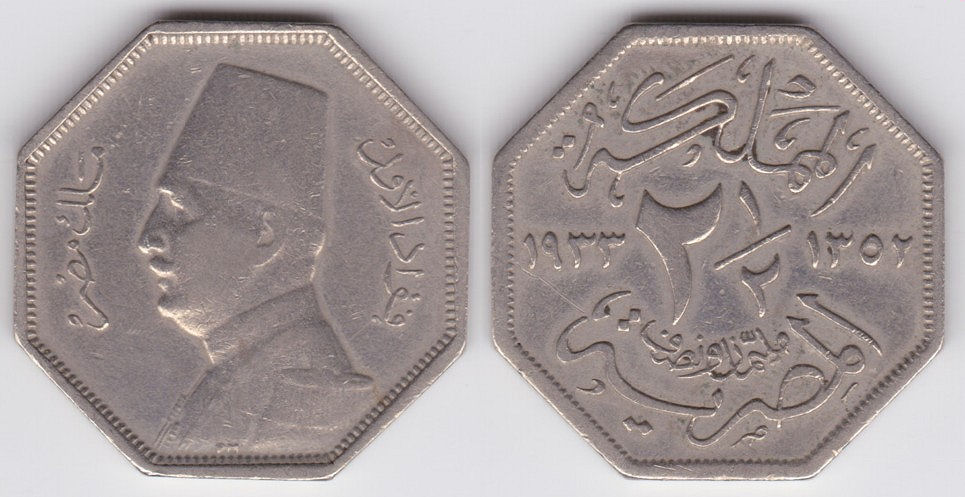
Octagonal ^{2}/_{1} milliemes coin from the Kingdom of Egypt.

The Chile 1 peso and 5 pesos coins issued from 1992 to 2015 are eight-sided. So was the old circulating Malta 25 cent coin commemorating Malta's first anniversary of the republic and some California gold coins. Some other countries that have issued circulating octagonal coins are Lebanon and Sierra Leone.

== Nonagonal ==
In 1972 the first country to issue a circulating nine-sided coin was Thailand with a 1972 regular 5 baht coin, followed by Kenya in 1973 with a special issue 5/= coin. The third and final circulating nonagonal coin issued in the 20th century and is the regular 1976 50 cent coin from Tuvalu. Currently, the Philippines issues nonagonal 5-peso coins from 2019 as an enhanced design of the round version to make it distinct from the other denominations.

== Decagonal ==
Hong Kong issued a ten-sided 5 dollar coin from 1976 to 1979, while the Philippines issued ten-sided two piso (peso) coins from September 30, 1983 to March 9, 1991. Some other countries that have issued ten-sided circulation coins are Chile, the Dominican Republic, Jamaica and Madagascar.

== Hendecagonal ==
The old Indian 2-rupee coin was eleven-sided, while the Canadian one dollar coin is an eleven-sided Reuleaux polygon. Also Madagascar has issued some circulating eleven-sided coins.

== Dodecagonal ==
The United Kingdom used a dodecagonal threepence from 1937 to 1971.

Many countries have struck twelve-sided coins, mostly countries belonging to the Commonwealth of Nations. Several of these are threepence coins from the pre-decimal pound. Coins currently circulating include the British one pound coin, 50 cent coins from Australia, Fiji and the Solomon Islands, the Tongan 50 seniti coin and the circulating commemorative Croatian 25 kuna coins.

== Tridecagonal ==
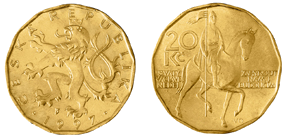
The 20 koruna coin from the Czech Republic is tridecagonal.

In 1993, the Czech Republic was the first country to issue a 13 sided 20 koruna coin. In 2013, Tunisia followed with a 13-sided 200 millièmes coin.

== Pentadecagonal ==
A 5 dirham commemorative coin from the UAE in 1981 had 15 sides, commemorating the 15th century of Hejira.

== Scalloped ==
Many countries have coins with scalloped (wavy) edges. These usually have twelve bumps (e.g. the Vanuatu 100 vatu or the Hong Kong 20 cents), but can have other numbers such as eight (the Eswatini 10 cents or the Ang Bagong Lipunan Philippine five centavo coin) or sixteen (the Libya 50 dirhams).

== Holed ==
Often a round coin will have a central hole. In some countries this was to allow them to be strung together, while other reasons include difficulty of counterfeiting and ability for visually impaired people to distinguish them from other coins.

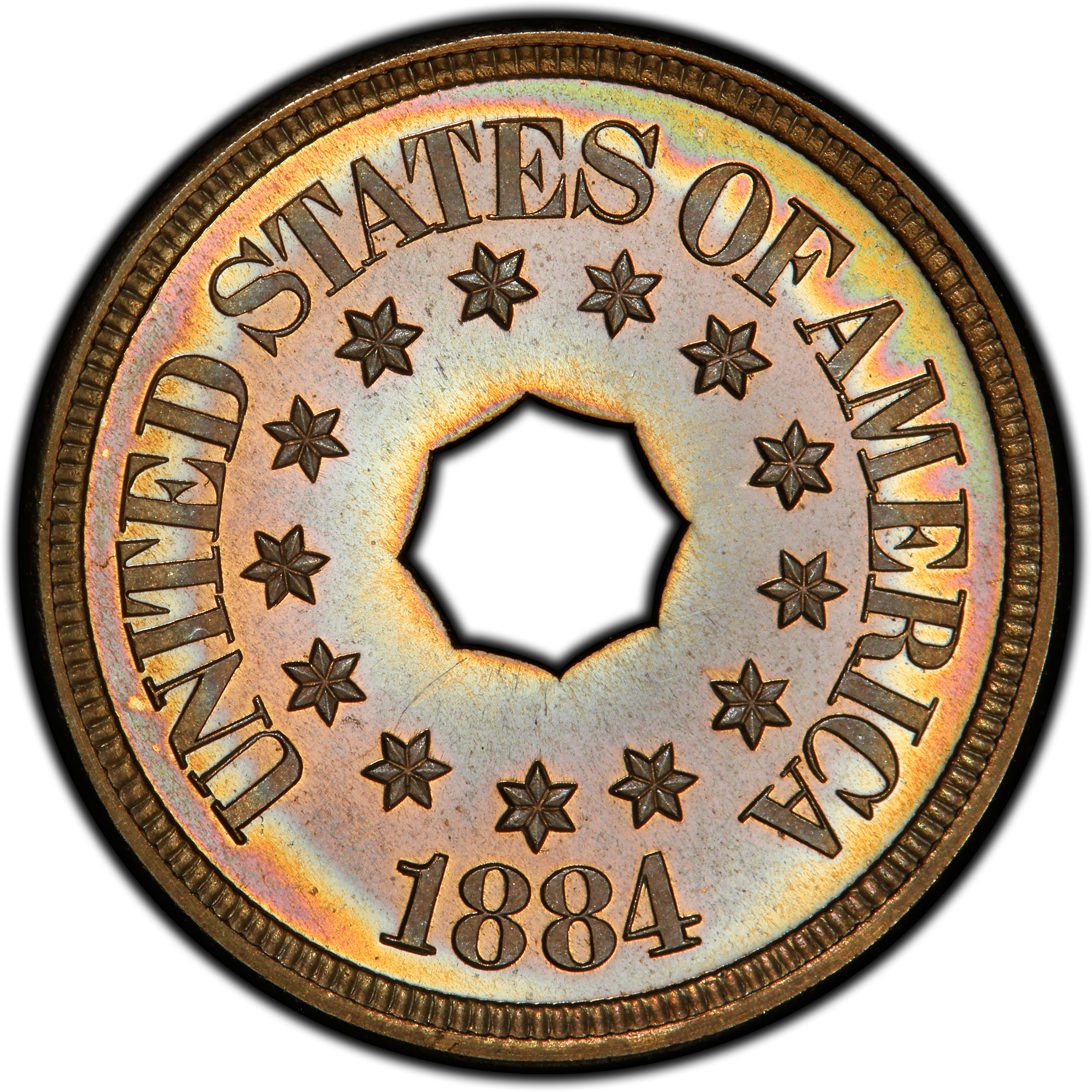
A pattern United States ring nickel with an octagonal hole.

Some coins give the impression that holes were used to save metal, though it may not be possible to prove with certainty that this was the reason for creating the holes. An example of such a coin with a fairly large hexagonal hole is a undated tin 1 cash coin, minted in the period 1550–1596, that circulated in the Banten Sultanate on Java and Sumatra (Indonesia). Also, several tin 1 pitis coins with exceptionally large round holes, of which some were made in octagonal coins, were used in Jambi Sultanate on Northern Sumatra (Indonesia). Due to the soft metal tin used to make these thin old coins, they can easily be bent. In the years 1943–1947 India produced 1 pice coins for circulation with very large holes, continued by Pakistan producing 1 pice coins of equal shape in the years 1948–1952.

Chinese cash coins had a square hole, while many modern coins have a round hole. Examples include the Japan 5 yen coin and 50 yen coin, and the Danish 1, 2 and 5 krone coins.

== Other shapes ==
Rectangles: In the Edo period Japan issued several circulating silver and gold rectangular coins, as well as a copper clad lead issue with a hole.

Near oval: Japan also issued various near oval coins in the Edo period.

Half circle: for Barbados Spanish coins were cut in half, it is hard to detect originals though, many forgeries exist.

== Additional shapes among non-circulating coins ==
Triangular: Bermuda has some special issue triangular coins from 1997 onward with curved edges. The Isle of Man has some triangular special issue coins where the triangle is not regular (the angles are not all 60 degrees).

Octagonal: The U.S. Panama–Pacific commemorative 50 dollar coins of 1915 is shaped like a true octagon.

Tetradecagonal: In 1976, Malaysia was the first country to issue 14-sided coins, the non-circulating 10 (silver) and 200 (gold) ringgit. Australia started to issue a series of non-circulating 14-sided 50 cents coins dedicated to the Chinese zodiac in 2012.

Rectangular: Jersey and Fiji have issued non-circulating rectangular coins.

Oval: Fiji and Poland have issued some non-circulating oval coins.

Quarter circle: Poland has issued a 10 złotych coin in the shape of a quarter circle.

Spheres: Niue issued the first official (non-circulating) spherical coin with a face value of 7 New Zealand dollars. Several other countries followed soon with spherical coins, like Poland and Barbados. A 2008–2014 1 dollar sphere issue from Somalia is considered a fantasy coin, it was not officially issued by Somalia.

Yin Yang: Fiji has issued some Yin Yang shaped coins.

Arc (section of a circle with a hole): China started to issue a series of arc-shaped coins in the year 2000.

Heart: Several countries have issued non-circulating heart shaped coins, like China, Cook Islands and Poland.

Maps: Nauru has issued some non-circulating map shaped coins. Australia also has issued some non-circulating map shaped coins (1 dollar coins in the shape of the map of Australia).

Coca-Cola cap: Fiji has issued some non-circulating coins shaped like the cap of a Coca-Cola bottle.

Cannabis leaf: Benin issued a non-circulating 100 CFA francs coin shaped like a cannabis leaf in 2011.

Masks: Fiji issued an Iron Man Mask and a Spider-Man Mask coin in 2019, both non-circulating.

== See also ==
- Spanish flower
