= Ring nickel =

19th-century US coin

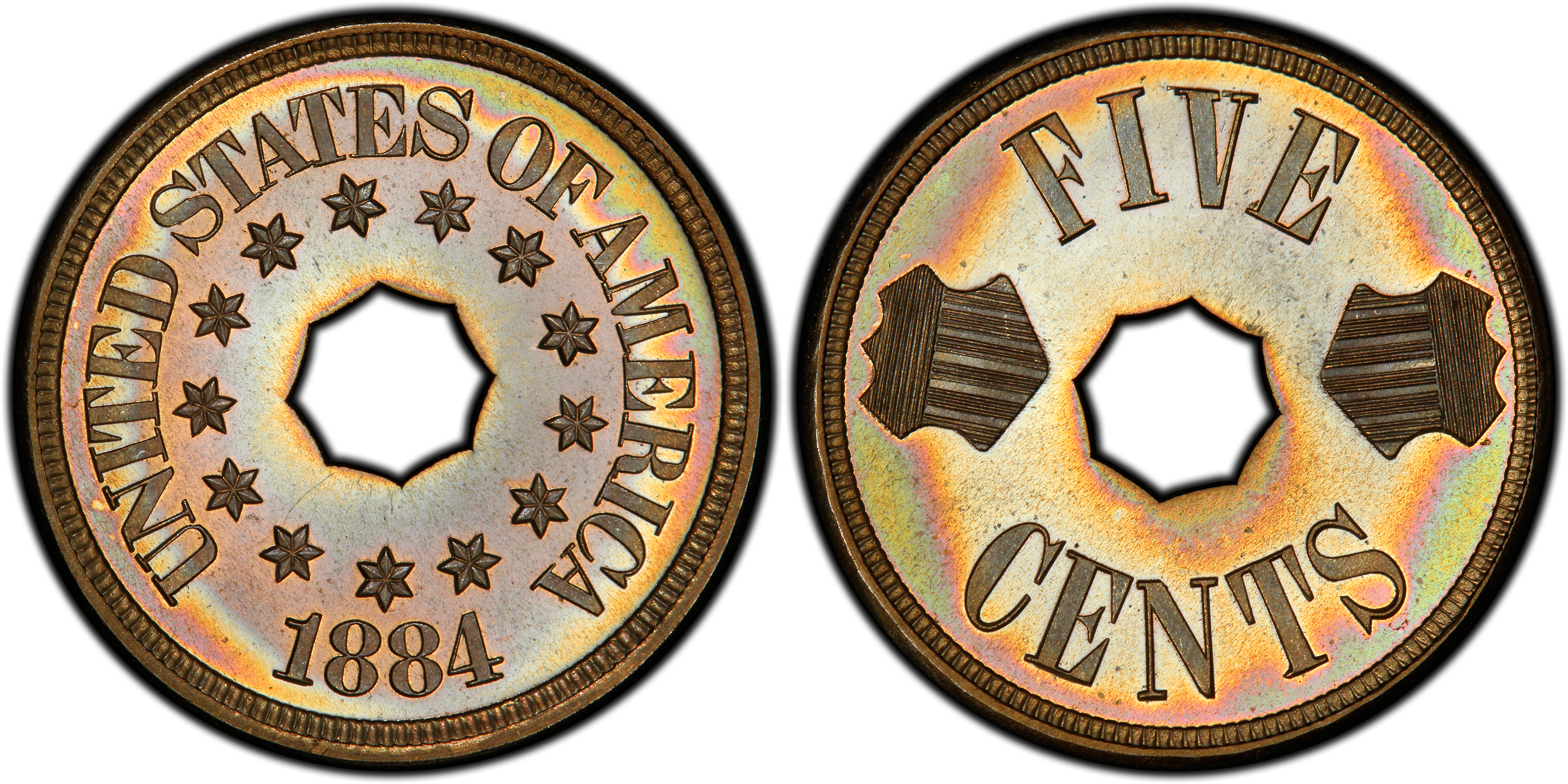
The 1884 ring nickel

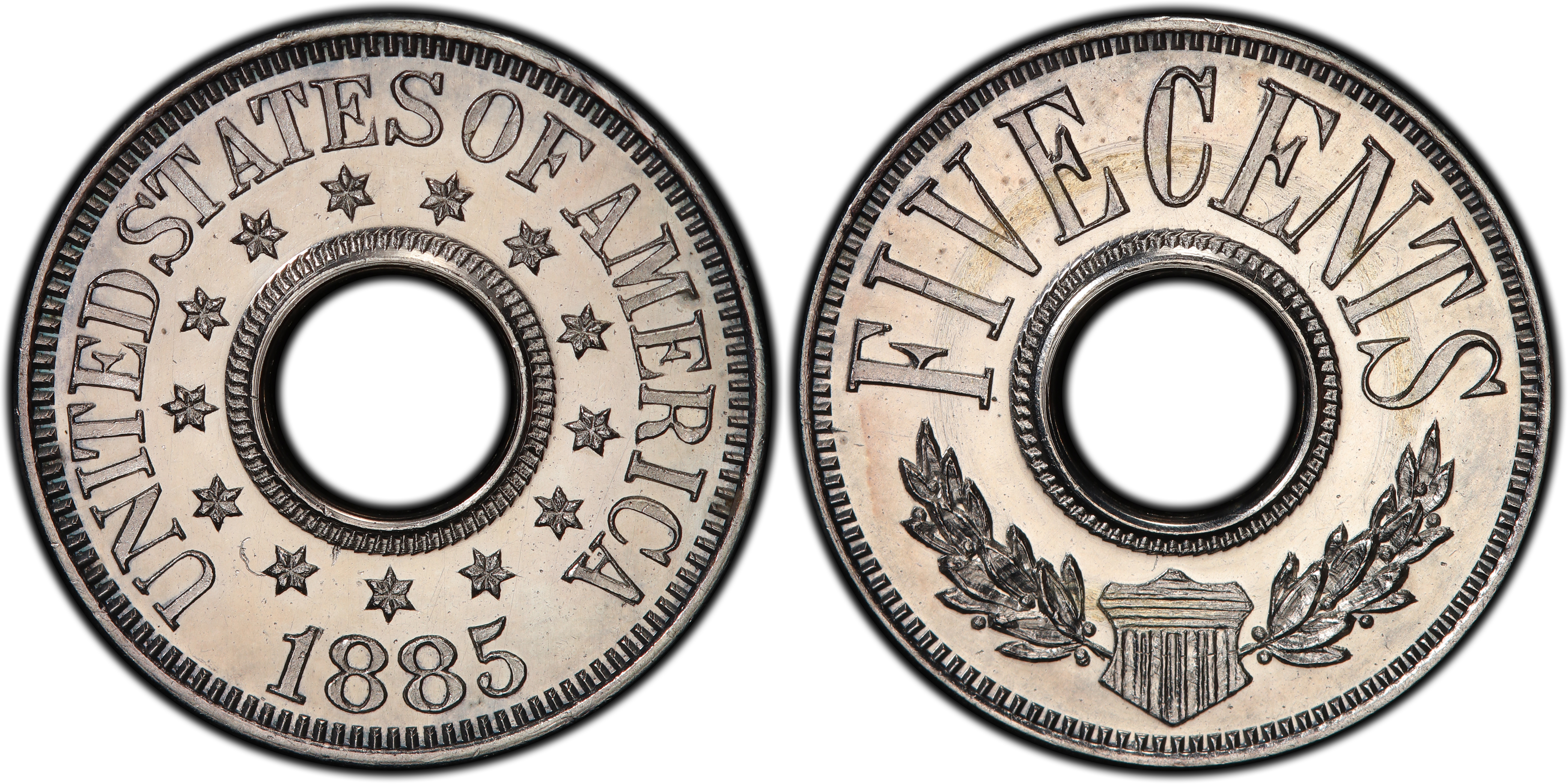
The 1885 ring nickel

The ring nickel (separate varieties known as J-1724, J-1725, and J-1742) was a United States pattern coin with a face value of five cents. It was struck in 1884 and 1885, even though the Liberty Head nickel had just been released in 1883.

The 1884 pattern had an octagonal hole and was struck in nickel, while the 1885 pattern had a round hole and was struck in silver.

== See also ==
- Ring cent
