= Two-cent billon =

United States pattern coin

- United states
- Value: 0.02 U.S. Dollar
- Mass: 3.84 g
- Composition: 90% Cu, 10% Ag
- Years of minting: 1836
- Mint marks: None, all were minted at the Philadelphia Mint

Obverse
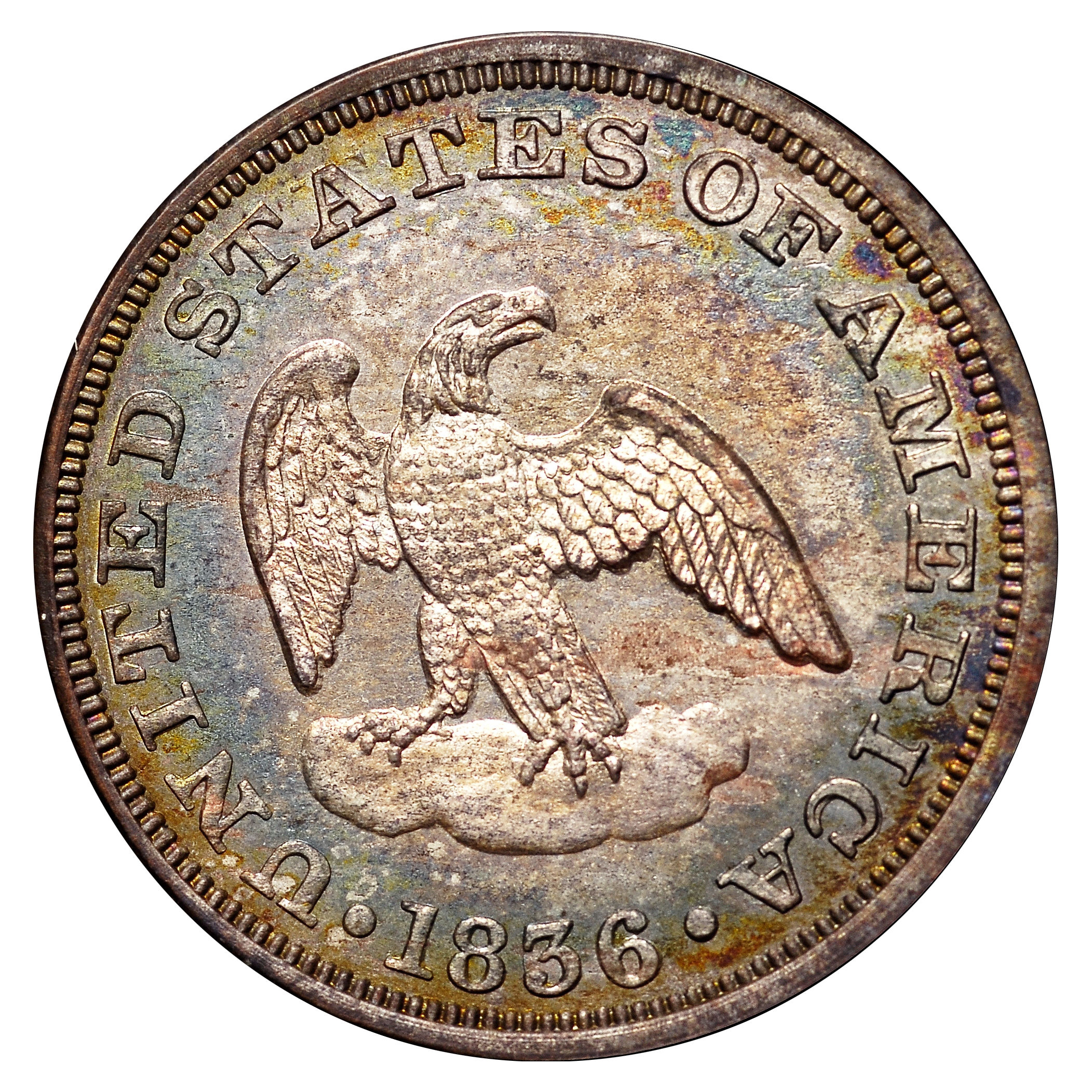
- Design: Eagle
- Designer: Christian Gobrecht
- Design date: 1836

Reverse
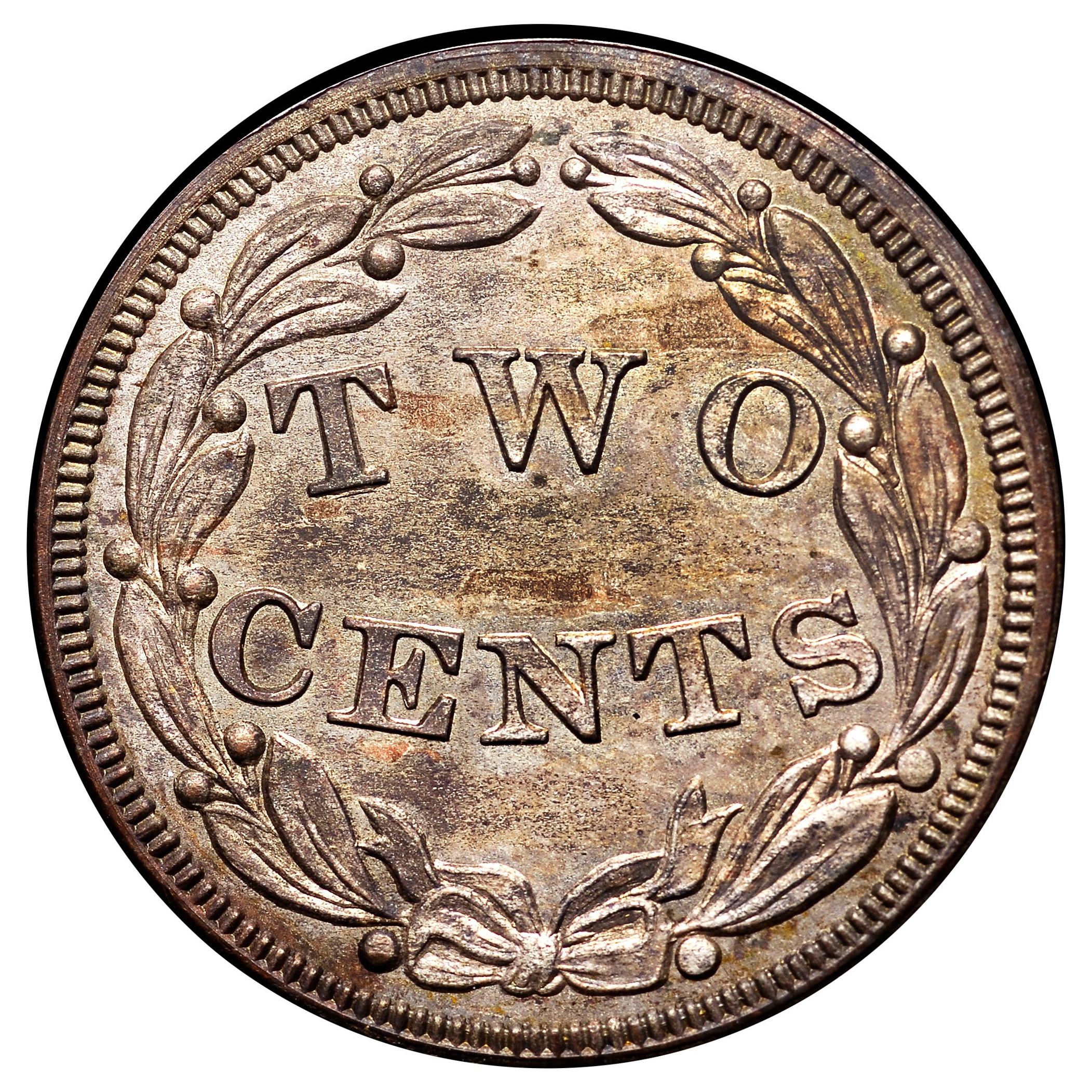
- Design: Denomination surrounded by a wreath
- Designer: Christian Gobrecht
- Design date: 1836

The two-cent billon was a pattern coin struck in 1836 and initially proposed as part of the Act of January 13, 1837. Versions exist with either a reeded edge and coin orientation or a plain edge and medal orientation; however, those with the former tend to be original strikes, whereas the latter are always proof restrikes (most from the 1850s).

== Background ==
A two-cent piece had been proposed as early as 1806 by Connecticut Senator Uriah Tracy, along with a twenty-cent piece or "double dime". Reflecting the then-prevalent view that coins should contain their value in metal, Tracy's bill provided that the two-cent piece be made of billon, or debased silver (about 20% pure). The proposed metal would have consisted of 6.4 grains (0.41 g) of silver and 24.3 grains (1.57 g) of copper. The Mint Director at the time Robert Patterson opposed the bill, as it would be difficult to refine the silver from melted-down pieces. Tracy's legislation failed in the House of Representatives, despite passing in the Senate twice.

== Inception ==
The Mint considered a two-cent piece again for the second time in 1836. Second Engraver Christian Gobrecht and Melter and Refiner Franklin Peale both conducted experiments for the coin, and concluded that the piece was to be made of billon (similar to the 1806 proposal). Although the coin was proposed in early drafts of the Mint Act of 1837, this the proposal was dropped when Peale showed that the coin could be easily counterfeited.

== Aftermath ==
A two cent piece was proposed for a third time during the economic turmoil of the American Civil War, due to a national coin shortage. For the most part, the lack of coins was filled by private token issues, some were struck in copper-nickel approximating the size of the cent and others were thinner pieces in bronze.

This fact did not escape government officials, and in 1863, the use of bronze coins was proposed, as they did not seem to contain their face values in metal. In his annual report submitted October 1, 1863, Mint Director James Pollock noted that "whilst people expect a full value in their gold and silver coins, they merely want the inferior [base metal] money for convenience in making exact payments". He observed that the private cent tokens had sometimes contained as little as a fifth of a cent in metal, yet had still circulated. He proposed that the copper-nickel cent be replaced with a bronze piece of the same size. Pollock also wanted to eliminate nickel as a coinage metal; its hard alloys destroyed dies and machinery. On December 8, Pollock wrote to Treasury Secretary Salmon P. Chase, proposing a bronze cent and two-cent piece, and enclosing pattern coins of the two-cent piece that he had had prepared. According to numismatist Neil Carothers, a two-cent piece was most likely proposed in order to get as much dollar value in small change into circulation in as short a time as possible, as the Mint could strike a two-cent piece as easily as a cent.

The bronze two-cent piece eventually became a regular issue, but with declining mintage numbers each year until it was discontinued officially in 1873.

== Varieties ==
Catalog number			Description
Judd	Pollock	Adams and Woodin	Description
52	55	–	Billon with smooth edge
53	54	–	Billon with reeded edge
54	57	–	Copper with smooth edge
54A	55A	56	Cupronickel with smooth edge
54B	55B	57	Cupronickel with reeded edge
55	56	–	Copper with reeded edge
56	59	–	White metal or tin-washed copper with smooth edge
56A	58	–	White metal or tin-washed copper with reeded edge
–	–	59	Silver or silver-plated billon or copper

== Sources ==
- Carothers, Neil (1930). Fractional Money: A History of Small Coins and Fractional Paper Currency of the United States. New York: John Wiley & Sons, Inc. (reprinted 1988 by Bowers and Merena Galleries, Inc., Wolfeboro, N.H.). ISBN 0-943161-12-6.
- Radeker, William T. (November 1991). "Those Collectable 2-Cent Pieces". The Numismatist. Colorado Springs, CO: American Numismatic Association: 1739–1741, 1805. ISSN 0029-6090.
- Taxay, Don (1983). The U.S. Mint and Coinage (reprint of 1966 ed.). New York: Sanford J. Durst Numismatic Publications. ISBN 978-0-915262-68-7.
