= Hypersomnia (video game) =

2023 video game

- Developer: Patryk Czachurski
- Platforms: Windows, macOS, Linux and any modern web browser (hypersomnia.io)
- Release: 28 December 2023 (Steam edition)
- Genre: Action game
- Mode: Multiplayer

Hypersomnia is a Polish two-dimensional online shooter game created by Patryk Czachurski. The game is inspired by the Hotline Miami and Counter-Strike games. The game development team consists as of 2025 of 4 people, each person being responsible for programming, graphical effects, level designing and website management.

The game's source code is published on GNU AGPL 3.0 license. It is available for Windows, macOS and Linux, and can be played in a web browser. The first tournaments related to this game were played at the 39th edition of PolyLAN, and also at Poznańska Impreza Wolnego Oprogramowania (Poznań's Free Software Party) in 2025.

== Development ==
The game's development took ten years, and it was released on Steam on 28 December 2023. The first commits were registered on GitHub as early as 2013, with game becoming playable around 2017.

A rectangle packing library, called rectpack2D and created specifically for Hypersomnia, was used in the game Assassin's Creed Valhalla, by American drone manufacturer Skydio, and inside the Snapchat's Android mobile app. The ACM Transactions on Graphics journal has also published a paper referring to rectpack2D in 2019.

A 2018 patent, belonging to Unity referred to the assemblage buckets problem which was conceptualised by Czachurski a few years earlier on one of Stack-Exchange-owned forums. Although Hypersomnia's lead developer claimed that no game engine was used in the development process, he confirmed to the technology news website "Kontrabanda" that "a few" external programming libraries were used.

== Reception ==
Both Liam Dawe of GamingOnLinux website and editorial team of lubiegrac.pl website praised the game in terms of its technical aspects. Additionally, it received a praise from official GitHub blog team, with them saying about Hypersomnia "giving a lot of fun" and the game "being technically innovative". Linux Magazine in its 275th issue has highlighted Hypersomnia in FOSSPicks category.

Year	Event name	Nominated for	Result
2023	Game Development World Championship	Best Community Design	Won
2023	Game Development World Championship	Best Multiplayer Game	Nominated
2023	Game Development World Championship	Accolade for Immersive Audio	Nominated
2023	Game Development World Championship	Best Action Game	Nominated

== Gallery ==
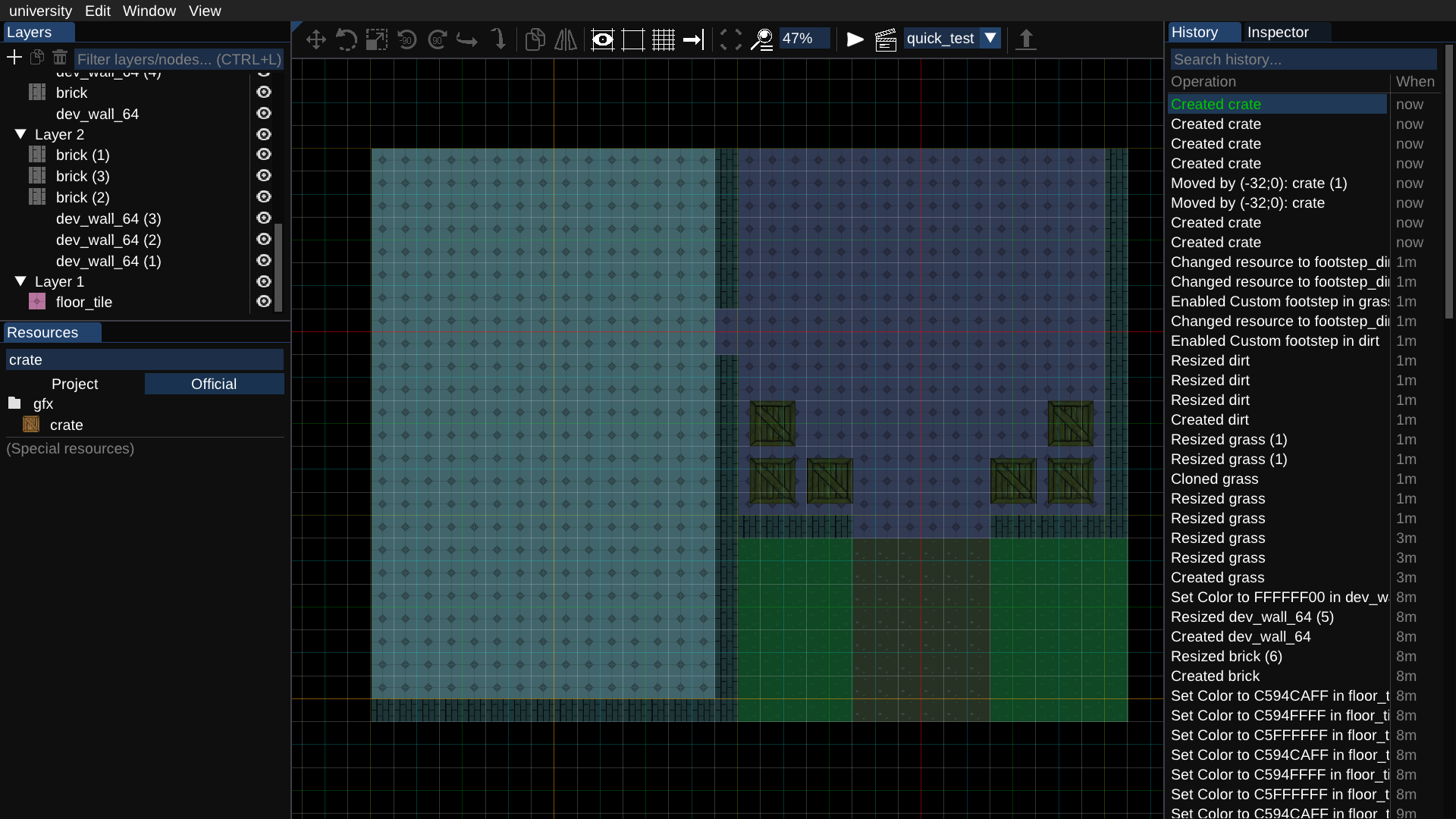
Hypersomnia's map editor

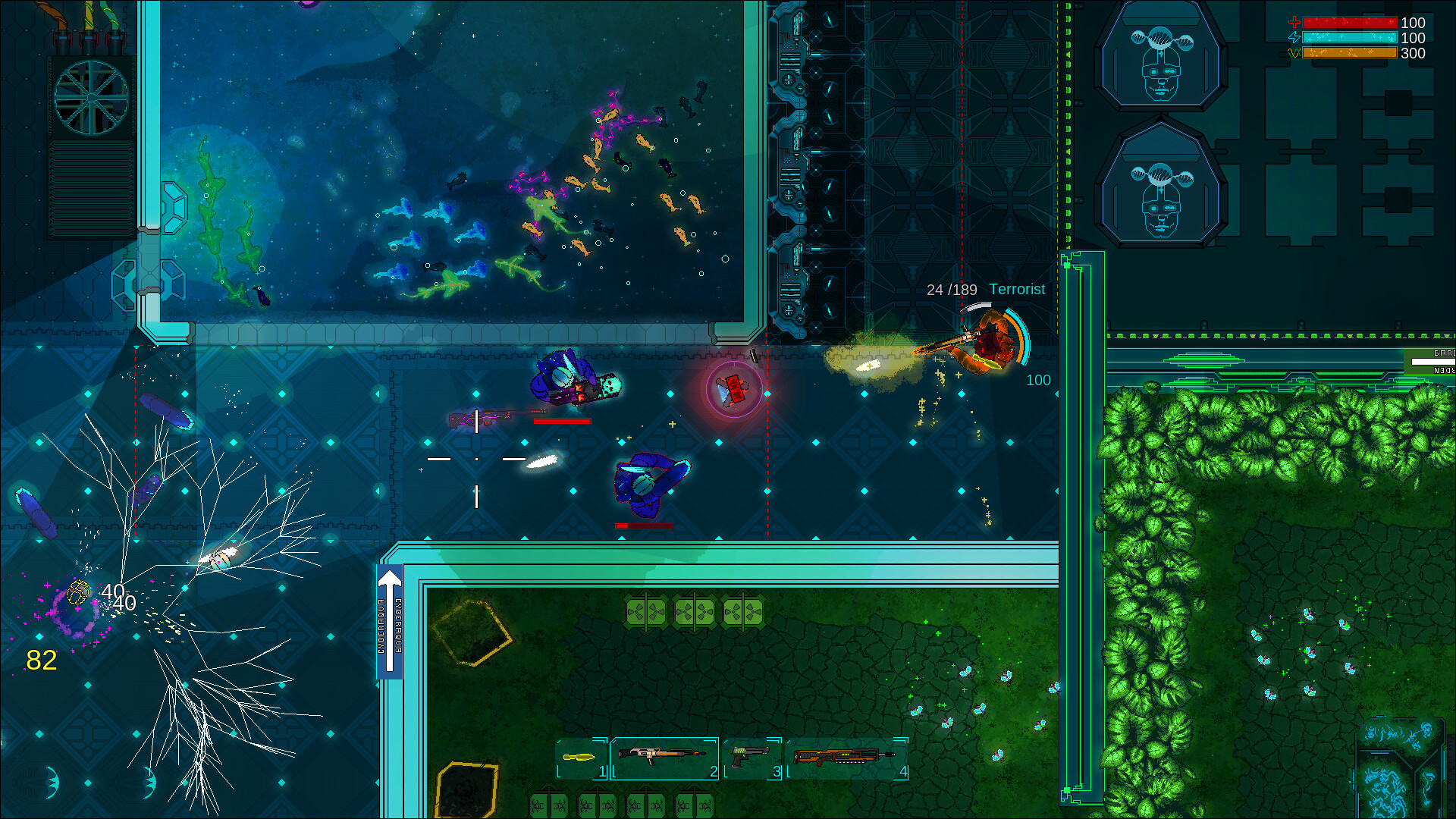
More gameplay
