= Ellipsoid packing =

In geometry, ellipsoid packing is the problem of arranging identical ellipsoids throughout three-dimensional space to fill the maximum possible fraction of space.

The currently densest known packing structure for ellipsoid has two candidates, a simple monoclinic crystal with two ellipsoids of different orientations and a square-triangle crystal containing 24 ellipsoids in the fundamental cell. The former monoclinic structure can reach a maximum packing fraction around $0.77073$ for ellipsoids with maximal aspect ratios larger than $\sqrt{3}$. The packing fraction of the square-triangle crystal exceeds that of the monoclinic crystal for specific biaxial ellipsoids, like ellipsoids with ratios of the axes $\alpha:\sqrt{\alpha}:1$ and $\alpha \in (1.365,1.5625)$. Any ellipsoids with aspect ratios larger than one can pack denser than spheres.

== See also ==
- Packing problems
- Sphere packing
- Tetrahedron packing
