= Karl Adams (mathematician) =

Swiss mathematician

Karl Adams (1811 in Merscheid – 14 November 1849, in Winterthur) was a Swiss mathematician and teacher who specialised in synthetic geometry.

== Publications ==
- Lehre von den Transversalen, 1843
- Die harmonischen Verhältnisse, 1845
- Die merkwürdigen Eigenschaften des geradlinigen Dreiecks, 1846
- Das Malfattische Problem, 1846 and 1848, on the Malfatti circles
- Geometrische Aufgaben mit besonderer Rücksicht auf geometrische ConstruCtion, 1847 and 1849

== Sources ==
- Allgemeine Deutsche Biographie – online version at Wikisource
