= Disk covering problem =

Unsolved problem in discrete geometry

Unsolved problem in mathematics
What is the smallest real number $r(n)$ such that $n$ disks of radius $r(n)$ can be arranged in such a way as to cover the unit disk?
More unsolved problems in mathematics

The disk covering problem asks for the smallest real number $r(n)$ such that $n$ disks of radius $r(n)$ can be arranged in such a way as to cover the unit disk. Dually, for a given radius ε, one wishes to find the smallest integer n such that n disks of radius ε can cover the unit disk.

The best solutions known to date are as follows:

n	r(n)	Symmetry
1	1	All
2	1	All (2 stacked disks)
3	$\sqrt{3}/2$ = 0.866025...	120°, 3 reflections
4	$\sqrt{2}/2$ = 0.707107...	90°, 4 reflections
5	0.609382... OEIS: A133077	1 reflection
6	0.555905... OEIS: A299695	1 reflection
7	$1/2$ = 0.5	60°, 6 reflections
8	0.445041...	~51.4°, 7 reflections
9	0.414213...	45°, 8 reflections
10	0.394930...	36°, 9 reflections
11	0.380083...	1 reflection
12	0.361141...	120°, 3 reflections

== Method ==
The following picture shows an example of a dashed disk of radius 1 covered by six solid-line disks of radius ~0.6. One of the covering disks is placed central and the remaining five in a symmetrical way around it.

While this is not the best layout for r(6), similar arrangements of six, seven, eight, and nine disks around a central disk all having same radius are the best layout strategies for r(7), r(8), r(9), and r(10), respectively. The corresponding angles θ are written in the "Symmetry" column in the above table.

== See also ==
- Circle packing in a circle (the disks cannot overlap and cannot extend beyond the circle)
