= Malfatti circles =

Three tangent circles in a triangle

Malfatti circles

In geometry, the Malfatti circles are three circles inside a given triangle such that each circle is tangent to the other two and to two sides of the triangle. They are named after Gian Francesco Malfatti, who made early studies of the problem of constructing these circles in the mistaken belief that they would have the largest possible total area of any three disjoint circles within the triangle.

Malfatti's problem has been used to refer both to the problem of constructing the Malfatti circles and to the problem of finding three area-maximizing circles within a triangle. A simple construction of the Malfatti circles was given by Steiner (1826), and many mathematicians have since studied the problem. Malfatti himself supplied a formula for the radii of the three circles, and they may also be used to define two triangle centers, the Ajima–Malfatti points of a triangle.

The problem of maximizing the total area of three circles in a triangle is never solved by the Malfatti circles. Instead, the optimal solution can always be found by a greedy algorithm that finds the largest circle within the given triangle, the largest circle within the three connected subsets of the triangle outside of the first circle, and the largest circle within the five connected subsets of the triangle outside of the first two circles. Although this procedure was first formulated in 1930, its correctness was not proven until 1994.

== Malfatti's problem ==
Unsolved problem in mathematics
Does the greedy algorithm always find area-maximizing packings of more than three circles in any triangle?
More unsolved problems in mathematics

In an equilateral triangle the area of the Malfatti circles (left) is approximately 1% smaller than the three area-maximizing circles (right).

Gian Francesco Malfatti (1803) posed the problem of cutting three cylindrical columns out of a triangular prism of marble, maximizing the total volume of the columns. He assumed that the solution to this problem was given by three tangent circles within the triangular cross-section of the wedge. That is, more abstractly, he conjectured that the three Malfatti circles have the maximum total area of any three disjoint circles within a given triangle. Malfatti's work was popularized for a wider readership in French by Joseph Diaz Gergonne in the first volume of his Annales (1811), with further discussion in the second and tenth. However, Gergonne only stated the circle-tangency problem, not the area-maximizing one.

In an isosceles triangle with a sharp apex, Malfatti's circles (top) occupy roughly half of the area of three circles stacked with a greedy algorithm (below).

Malfatti's assumption that the two problems are equivalent is incorrect. Lob and Richmond (1930), who went back to the original Italian text, observed that for some triangles a larger area can be achieved by a greedy algorithm that inscribes a single circle of maximal radius within the triangle, inscribes a second circle within one of the three remaining corners of the triangle, the one with the smallest angle, and inscribes a third circle within the largest of the five remaining pieces. The difference in area for an equilateral triangle is small, just over 1%, but as Howard Eves (1946) pointed out, for an isosceles triangle with a very sharp apex, the optimal circles (stacked one atop each other above the base of the triangle) have nearly twice the area of the Malfatti circles.

In fact, the Malfatti circles are never optimal. It was discovered through numerical computations in the 1960s, and later proven rigorously, that the Lob–Richmond procedure always produces the three circles with largest area, and that these are always larger than the Malfatti circles. Melissen (1997) conjectured more generally that, for any integer n, the greedy algorithm finds the area-maximizing set of n circles within a given triangle; the conjecture is known to be true for n ≤ 3.

== History ==
The problem of constructing three circles tangent to each other within a triangle was posed by the 18th-century Japanese mathematician Ajima Naonobu prior to the work of Malfatti, and included in an unpublished collection of Ajima's works made a year after Ajima's death by his student Kusaka Makoto. Even earlier, the same problem was considered in a 1384 manuscript by Gilio di Cecco da Montepulciano, now in the Municipal Library of Siena, Italy. Jacob Bernoulli (1744) studied a special case of the problem, for a specific isosceles triangle.

Since the work of Malfatti, there has been a significant amount of work on methods for constructing Malfatti's three tangent circles; Richard K. Guy writes that the literature on the problem is "extensive, widely scattered, and not always aware of itself". Notably, Jakob Steiner (1826) presented a simple geometric construction based on bitangents; other authors have since claimed that Steiner's presentation lacked a proof, which was later supplied by Andrew Hart (1856), but Guy points to the proof scattered within two of Steiner's own papers from that time. Solutions based on algebraic formulations of the problem include those by C. L. Lehmus (1819), E. C. Catalan (1846), C. Adams (1846, 1849), J. Derousseau (1895), and Andreas Pampuch (1904). The algebraic solutions do not distinguish between internal and external tangencies among the circles and the given triangle; if the problem is generalized to allow tangencies of either kind, then a given triangle will have 32 different solutions and conversely a triple of mutually tangent circles will be a solution for eight different triangles. Bottema (2001) credits the enumeration of these solutions to Pampuch (1904), but Cajori (1893) notes that this count of the number of solutions was already given in a remark by Steiner (1826). The problem and its generalizations were the subject of many other 19th-century mathematical publications, and its history and mathematics have been the subject of ongoing study since then. It has also been a frequent topic in books on geometry.

Gatto (2000) and Mazzotti (1998) recount an episode in 19th-century Neapolitan mathematics related to the Malfatti circles. In 1839, Vincenzo Flauti, a synthetic geometer, posed a challenge involving the solution of three geometry problems, one of which was the construction of Malfatti's circles; his intention in doing so was to show the superiority of synthetic to analytic techniques. Despite a solution being given by Fortunato Padula, a student in a rival school of analytic geometry, Flauti awarded the prize to his own student, Nicola Trudi, whose solutions Flauti had known of when he posed his challenge. More recently, the problem of constructing the Malfatti circles has been used as a test problem for computer algebra systems.

== Steiner's construction ==
Steiner's construction of the Malfatti circles using bitangents

Although much of the early work on the Malfatti circles used analytic geometry, Steiner (1826) provided the following simple synthetic construction.

A circle that is tangent to two sides of a triangle, as the Malfatti circles are, must be centered on one of the angle bisectors of the triangle (green in the figure). These bisectors partition the triangle into three smaller triangles, and Steiner's construction of the Malfatti circles begins by drawing a different triple of circles (shown dashed in the figure) inscribed within each of these three smaller triangles. In general these circles are disjoint, so each pair of two circles has four bitangents (lines touching both). Two of these bitangents pass between their circles: one is an angle bisector, and the second is shown as a red dashed line in the figure. Label the three sides of the given triangle as a, b, and c, and label the three bitangents that are not angle bisectors as x, y, and z, where x is the bitangent to the two circles that do not touch side a, y is the bitangent to the two circles that do not touch side b, and z is the bitangent to the two circles that do not touch side c. Then the three Malfatti circles are the inscribed circles to the three tangential quadrilaterals abyx, aczx, and bczy. In case of symmetry two of the dashed circles may touch in a point on a bisector, making two bitangents coincide there, but still setting up the relevant quadrilaterals for Malfatti's circles.

The three bitangents x, y, and z cross the triangle sides at the point of tangency with the third inscribed circle, and may also be found as the reflections of the angle bisectors across the lines connecting pairs of centers of these incircles.

== Radius formula ==
The radius of each of the three Malfatti circles may be determined as a formula involving the three side lengths a, b, and c of the triangle, the inradius r, the semiperimeter $s = (a + b + c)/2$, and the three distances d, e, and f from the incenter of the triangle to the vertices opposite sides a, b, and c respectively. The formulae for the three radii are:
$$\begin{align}
r_1 &= \frac{r}{2(s-a)}(s-r+d-e-f),\\
r_2 &= \frac{r}{2(s-b)}(s-r-d+e-f),\\
r_3 &= \frac{r}{2(s-c)}(s-r-d-e+f).\\
\end{align}$$

Related formulae may be used to find examples of triangles whose side lengths, inradii, and Malfatti radii are all rational numbers or all integers. For instance, the triangle with side lengths 28392, 21000, and 25872 has inradius 6930 and Malfatti radii 3969, 4900, and 4356. As another example, the triangle with side lengths 152460, 165000, and 190740 has inradius 47520 and Malfatti radii 27225, 30976, and 32400.

== Ajima–Malfatti points ==
First Ajima–Malfatti point

Given a triangle ABC and its three Malfatti circles, let D, E, and F be the points where two of the circles touch each other, opposite vertices A, B, and C respectively. Then the three lines AD, BE, and CF meet in a single triangle center known as the first Ajima–Malfatti point after the contributions of Ajima and Malfatti to the circle problem. The second Ajima–Malfatti point is the meeting point of three lines connecting the tangencies of the Malfatti circles with the centers of the excircles of the triangle. Other triangle centers also associated with the Malfatti circles include the Yff–Malfatti point, formed in the same way as the first Malfatti point from three mutually tangent circles that are all tangent to the lines through the sides of the given triangle, but that lie partially outside the triangle, and the radical center of the three Malfatti circles (the point where the three bitangents used in their construction meet).

== See also ==
- Circle packing in an equilateral triangle
- Circle packing in an isosceles right triangle
- Six circles theorem
