= Gian Francesco Malfatti =

Italian mathematician (1731–1807)

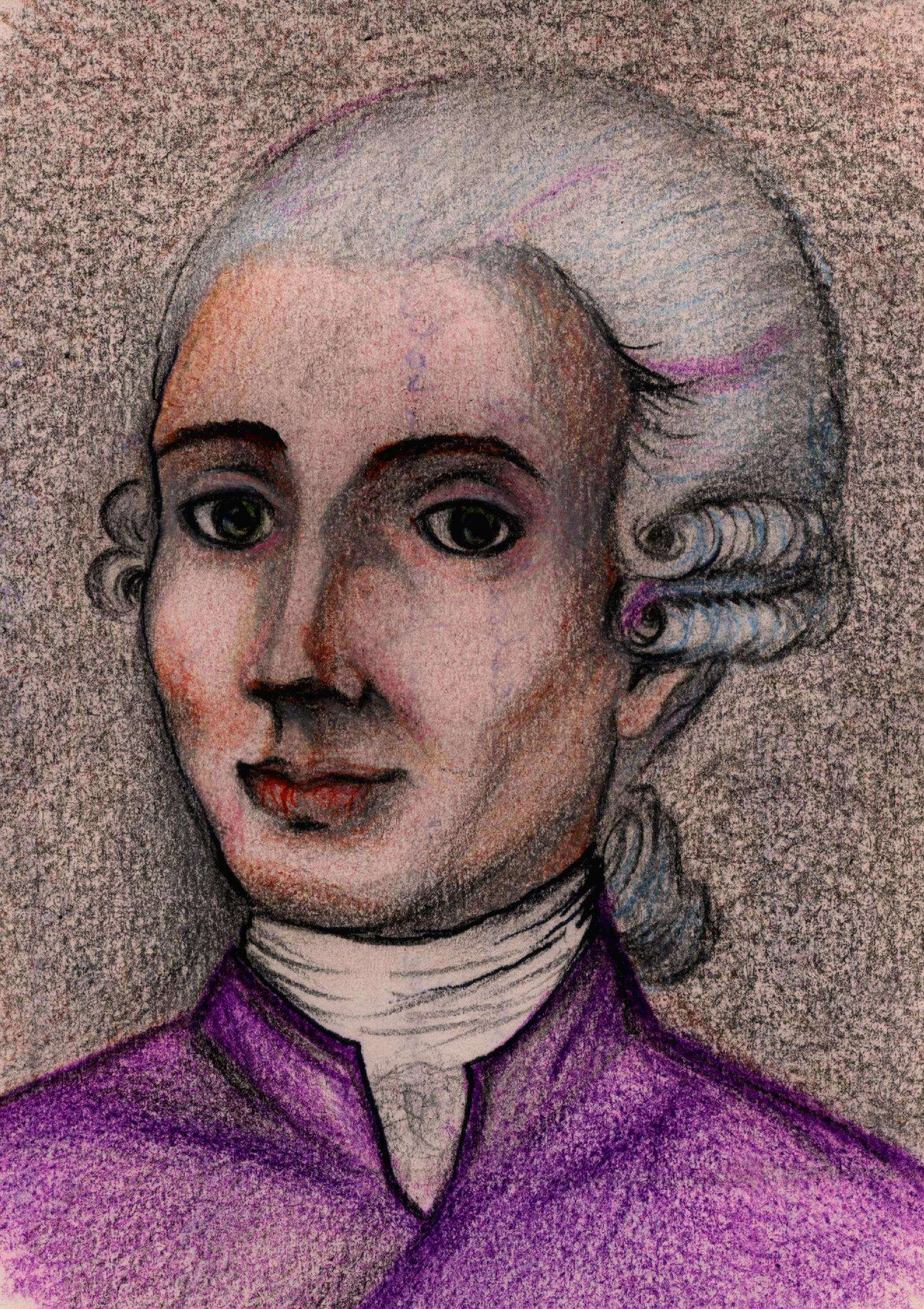
- Gian Francesco Malfatti
- Born: 26 September 1731; Ala, Trentino, Holy Roman Empire
- Died: 9 October 1807 (aged 76); Ferrara, Kingdom of Italy
- Resting place: Ferrara Cathedral
- Education: University of Bologna
- Known for: Malfatti circles Malfatti's problem Ajima–Malfatti points
- Scientific career
- Fields: Mathematics
- Workplaces: University of Ferrara
- Doctoral advisor: Vincenzo Riccati

Giovanni Francesco Giuseppe Malfatti, also known as Gian Francesco or Gianfrancesco (26 September 1731 – 9 October 1807) was an Italian mathematician. Best known for posing the Malfatti problem, he was also the first mathematician to “solve” the quintic using a resolvent of sixth degree.

== Biography ==
Gian Francesco Malfatti was born in Ala, Trentino, Holy Roman Empire. He studied at the University of Bologna where his mentors included Vincenzo Riccati, Laura Bassi, F. M. Zanotti and Gabriele Manfredi. He moved to Ferrara in 1754 and became a professor at the University of Ferrara when it was re-established in 1771. In 1782 he was one of the founders of the Società Italiana delle Scienze, founded by Antonio Maria Lorgna, later to become the Accademia nazionale delle scienze detta dei XL. Following Napoleon's invasion of Italy, Malfatti reluctantly collaborated with the French. When the Austro-Russian army occupied Ferrara, he was stripped of his university tenure. He was reinstated in his positions after the battle of Marengo. Malfatti died in Ferrara on 9 October 1807, aged 76.

== Contributions to mathematics ==
Malfatti circles

In 1803, Malfatti posed the problem of carving three circular columns out of a triangular block of marble, using as much of the marble as possible, and conjectured that three mutually tangent circles inscribed within the triangle would provide the optimal solution. These tangent circles are now known as Malfatti circles after his work, despite the earlier work of Japanese mathematician Ajima Naonobu and of Malfatti's countryman Gilio di Cecco da Montepulciano on the same problem and even though the conjecture was later proven false. Several triangle centers derived from these circles are also named after both Ajima and Malfatti.

The gravitational property of the lemniscate

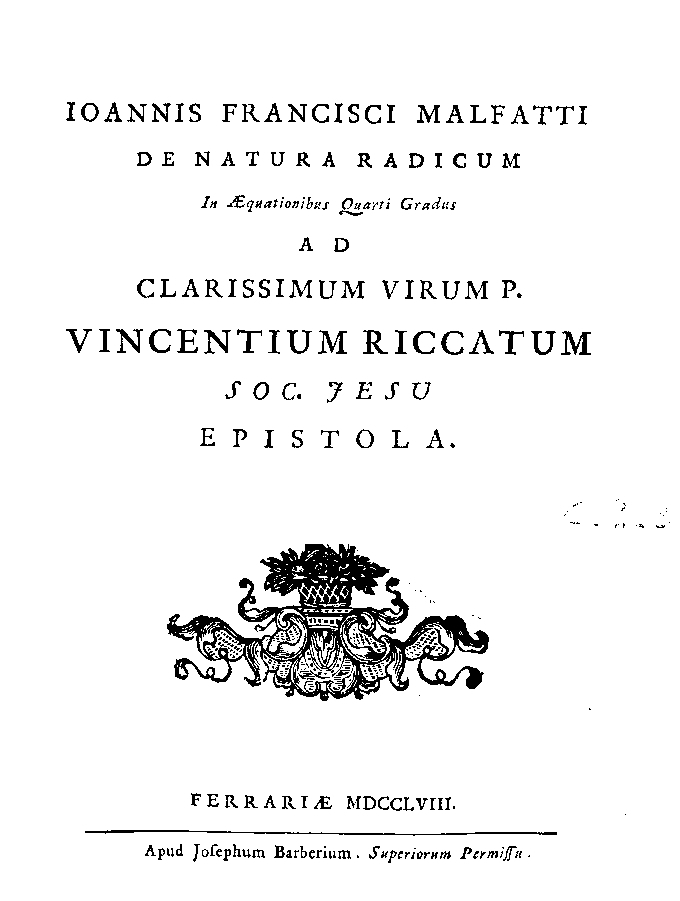
De natura radicum in aequationibus quarti gradus, 1758

Additional topics in Malfatti's research concerned quintic equations and the property of the lemniscate of Bernoulli that a ball rolling down an arc of the lemniscate, under the influence of gravity, will take the same time to traverse it as a ball rolling down a straight line segment connecting the endpoints of the arc. In a study published in 1771 Malfatti, using a method of elimination derived from Euler and Bézout, arrived by calculation of a 5th degree equation at a resolvent of the 6th degree, the so-called Malfatti resolvent. In 1804, he criticized Paolo Ruffini’s first attempts to prove that equations of degree higher than 4 are not solvable by radicals and thus contributed to Ruffini’s later works.

== Publications ==
- Malfatti, Gianfrancesco (1803), "Memoria sopra un problema stereotomico", Memorie di matematica e di fisica della Società Italiana delle Scienze, 10: 235–244.
- De natura radicum in aequationibus quarti gradus (in Latin). Ferrara: Giuseppe Barbieri. 1758.
- Epistola altera ad... Vincentium Riccatum. Ferrariae, apud Iosephum Barberium (1759).
- De aequationibus quadrato-cubicis dissertation analitica. Atti dell'Accademia delle Scienze di Siena, t. 4 (1771) pp. 129–185.
- Lotto. Prodromo della Nuova Enciclopedia Italiana, Siena, per Vincenzo Pazzini Carli e figli, e Luigi e Benedetto Bindi (1779) pp. 66–95.
- Della Curva Cassiniana e di una nuova proprietà meccanica della quale essa è dotata, trattato sintetico. In Pavia, nella stamperia del Monastero di S. Salvatore (1781).
- Esame critico di un problema di probabilità del Sig. Daniele Bernoulli, e soluzione d'un altro problema analogo al Bernulliano. Memorie di Matematica e Fisica della Società Italiana, t. 1 (1782) pp. 768–824.
- Delle formole differenziali la cui integrazione dipende dalla rettificazione delle sezioni coniche. Memorie di Matematica e Fisica della Società Italiana, t. 2 (1784) pp. 749–786.
- Giuoco del lotto. Antologia Romana. In Roma, presso Gregorio Settari, t. 11 (1785) pp. 81–95.
- Delle serie ricorrenti. Memorie di Matematica e Fisica della Società Italiana, t. 3 (1786) pp. 571–663.
- Soluzione generale di un problema geometrico di Pappo Alessandrino. Memorie di Matematica e Fisica della Società Italiana, t. 4 (1788) pp. 201–205.
- "Essai analytique sur l'intégration de deux formules différentielles, et sur la somme générale des séries harmoniques a termes rationnels". Mémories de l'Acadèmie royale des sciences (in French). Torino: Jean Michel Briolo: 53–112. 1788–1789.
- Esame di una dimostrazione che dà l'Eulero di un Teorema analitico, e di una celebre regola per determinare la natura e i valori prossimi delle radici di qualunque equazione. Memorie di Matematica e Fisica della Società Italiana, t. 4 (1788) pp. 206–248.
- Determinazione del tempo che impiega un grave discendente per un canale circolare. Memorie di Matematica e Fisica della Società Italiana, t. 7 (1794) pp. 462–477.
- Pensieri sulla famosa questione de' logaritmi de' numeri negativi. Memorie della Reale Accademia di Mantova, t. 1 (1795) pp. 3–54.
- Tentativo sul problema delle pressioni che soffrono gli appoggi collocati agli angoli di una figura, derivate da un peso posto dentro la sua aia. Memorie di Matematica e Fisica della Società Italiana, t. 8 p. 2º (1799) pp. 319–415.
- Memoria sopra un problema stereotomico. Memorie di Matematica e Fisica della Società Italiana, t. 10 p. 1º (1803) pp. 235–244.
- Brevi riflessioni alla critica del tentativo pel problema delle pressioni, fatta dal Sig. Paoli nel t. IX di questa Società. Memorie di Matematica e Fisica della Società Italiana, t. 10 p. 1º (1803) pp. 245–284.
- Lettera al Presidente della Società Italiana delle Scienze. Memorie di Matematica e Fisica della Società Italiana, t. 11 (1804) pp. XXIX-XXXII.
- Dubbi proposti al socio Paolo Ruffini sulla sua dimostrazione dell'impossibilità di risolvere le equazioni superiori al quarto grado. Memorie di Matematica e Fisica della Società Italiana, t. 11 (1804) pp. 579–607.
- Appendice al problema delle pressioni. Memorie di Matematica e Fisica della Società Italiana, t. 12 p. 1º (1805) pp. 100–105.
- Saggio di alcuni problemi numerici. Memorie di Matematica e Fisica della Società Italiana, t. 12 p. 1º (1805) pp. 296–317.
- Problema geometrico: fra i triangoli equilateri, i quadrati e il circolo, che si possa inscrivere in un dato triangolo, sceglier la figura dell'aia massima. Memorie di Matematica e Fisica della Società Italiana, t. 13 p. 1º (1807) pp. 247–284.
