= Circle packing in an equilateral triangle =

Two-dimensional packing problem

Unsolved problem in mathematics
What is the smallest possible equilateral triangle which an amount n of unit circles can be packed into?
More unsolved problems in mathematics

Circle packing in an equilateral triangle is a packing problem in discrete mathematics where the objective is to pack n unit circles into the smallest possible equilateral triangle. Optimal solutions have been proved for n ≤ 15, and for any triangular number of circles, and conjectures are available for n ≤ 34.

A conjecture of Paul Erdős and Norman Oler states that, if n is a triangular number, then the optimal packings of n − 1 and of n circles have the same side length: that is, according to the conjecture, an optimal packing for n − 1 circles can be found by removing any single circle from the optimal hexagonal packing of n circles. This conjecture is now known to be true for n ≤ 15. In a paper by Graham and Lubachevsky concerning solutions for 22 ≤ n ≤ 34 they also conjectured seven infinite families of optimal solutions in addition to the one by Erdős and Oler. These families give conjectured solutions for many more numbers, including n = 37, 40, 42, 43, 46, 49.

Minimum solutions for the side length of the triangle:

Number of circles	Triangle number	Length	Area	Figure
1	Yes	$2 \sqrt {3}$ = 3.464...	5.196...	
2		$2 + 2 \sqrt {3}$ = 5.464...	12.928...	
3	Yes	$2 + 2 \sqrt {3}$ = 5.464...	12.928...	
4		$4 \sqrt {3}$ = 6.928...	20.784...	
5		$4 + 2 \sqrt {3}$ = 7.464...	24.124...	
6	Yes	$4 + 2 \sqrt {3}$ = 7.464...	24.124...	
7		$2 + 4 \sqrt {3}$ = 8.928...	34.516...	
8		$2 + 2 \sqrt{3} + \tfrac {2} {3} \sqrt{33}$ = 9.293...	37.401...	
9		$6 + 2 \sqrt {3}$ = 9.464...	38.784...	
10	Yes	$6 + 2 \sqrt {3}$ = 9.464...	38.784...	
11		$4 + 2 \sqrt {3} + \tfrac {4} {3} \sqrt{6}$ = 10.730...	49.854...	
12		$4 + 4 \sqrt {3}$ = 10.928...	51.712...	
13		$4 + \tfrac {10} {3} \sqrt{3} + \tfrac {2} {3} \sqrt{6}$ = 11.406...	56.338...	
14		$8 + 2 \sqrt {3}$ = 11.464...	56.908...	
15	Yes	$8 + 2 \sqrt {3}$ = 11.464...	56.908...	

A closely related problem is to cover the equilateral triangle with a fixed number of equal circles, having as small a radius as possible.

== See also ==
- Circle packing in an isosceles right triangle
- Malfatti circles, three circles of possibly unequal sizes packed into a triangle
