= Howard Eves =

American mathematician (1911–2004)

Eves pointed out in 1946 that in an isosceles triangle with a sharp apex, a greedy algorithm (below) constructs a stack of 3 circles occupying a much larger area than Malfatti's circles (top).

Howard Whitley Eves (10 January 1911, 6 June 2004) was an American mathematician, known for his work in geometry and the history of mathematics.

Eves received his B.S. from the University of Virginia, an M.A. from Harvard University, and a Ph.D. in mathematics from Oregon State University in 1948, the last with a dissertation titled A Class of Projective Space Curves written under Ingomar Hostetter. He then spent most of his career at the University of Maine, 1954–1976. In later life, he occasionally taught at University of Central Florida.

Eves was a strong spokesman for the Mathematical Association of America, which he joined in 1942, and whose Northeast Section he founded. For 25 years he edited the Elementary Problems section of the American Mathematical Monthly. He solved over 300 problems proposed in various mathematical journals. His six volume Mathematical Circles series, collecting humorous and interesting anecdotes about mathematicians, was recently reprinted by the MAA, who also published his two volume Great Moments in the History of Mathematics, and his autobiographical Mathematical Reminiscences in 2001.

Eves had six children.

== Books by Eves ==
- 1953. Introduction to the History of Mathematics, New York, Rinehart
- 1966. Functions of a Complex Variable, v. 1, Boston: Prindle, Weber & Schmidt
- 1966. Elementary matrix theory, Boston: Allyn and Bacon [Reprint: 1980. Dover Publications.]
- 1972. Survey of Geometry in 2 vols, 2nd ed. Boston: Allyn and Bacon.
- 1990. Foundations and Fundamental Concepts of Mathematics. 3rd. ed. Boston: PWS-Kent. [Reprint: 1997. Dover Publications.]

=== Mathematical Circles series ===
- 1969. In Mathematical Circles in 2 vols, slipcased. Boston: Prindle, Weber & Schmidt, Inc.
- 1971. Mathematical Circles Revisited, slipcased. Boston: Prindle, Weber & Schmidt, Inc.
- 1972. Mathematical Circles Squared, slipcased. Boston: Prindle, Weber & Schmidt, Inc.
- 1977. Mathematical Circles Adieu, slipcased. Boston: Prindle, Weber & Schmidt, Inc.
- 1988. Return to Mathematical Circles. Boston: PWS-Kent Publishing Company.
