= Tetrahedron packing =

Concept in three-dimensional geometry

In geometry, tetrahedron packing is the problem of arranging identical regular tetrahedra throughout three-dimensional space so as to fill the maximum possible fraction of space.

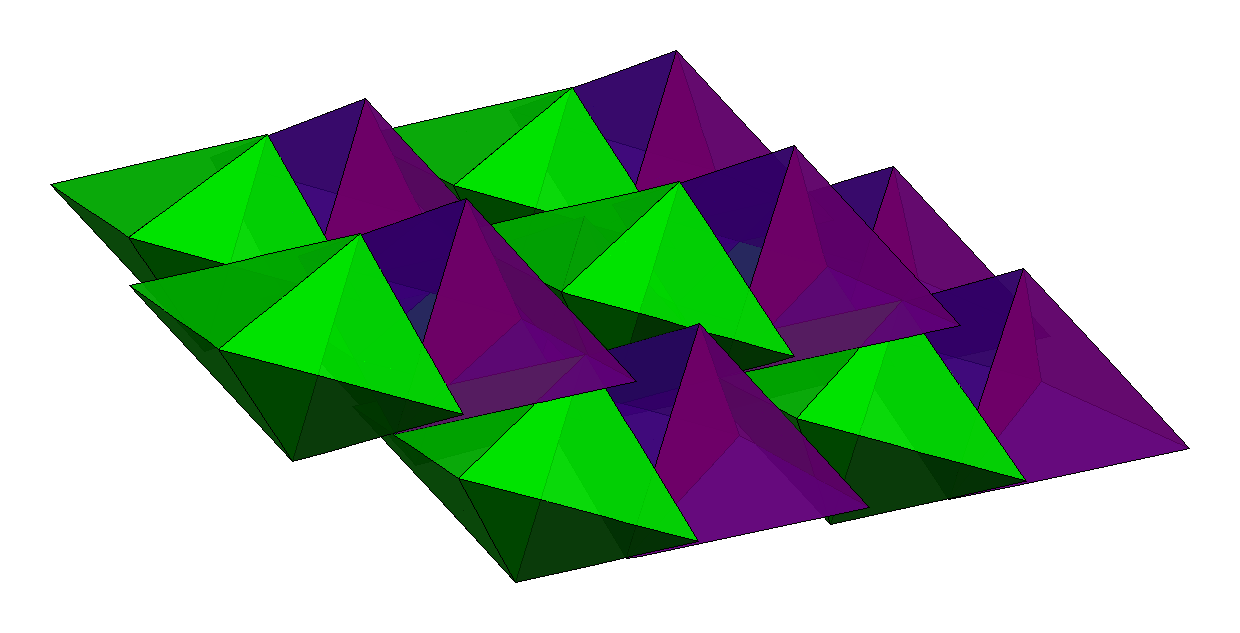
The currently densest known packing structure for regular tetrahedra is a double lattice of triangular bipyramids and fills 85.63% of space

Currently, the best lower bound achieved on the optimal packing fraction of regular tetrahedra is 85.63%. Tetrahedra do not tile space, and an upper bound below 100% (namely, 1 − (2.6...)·10^{−25}) has been reported.

== Historical results ==
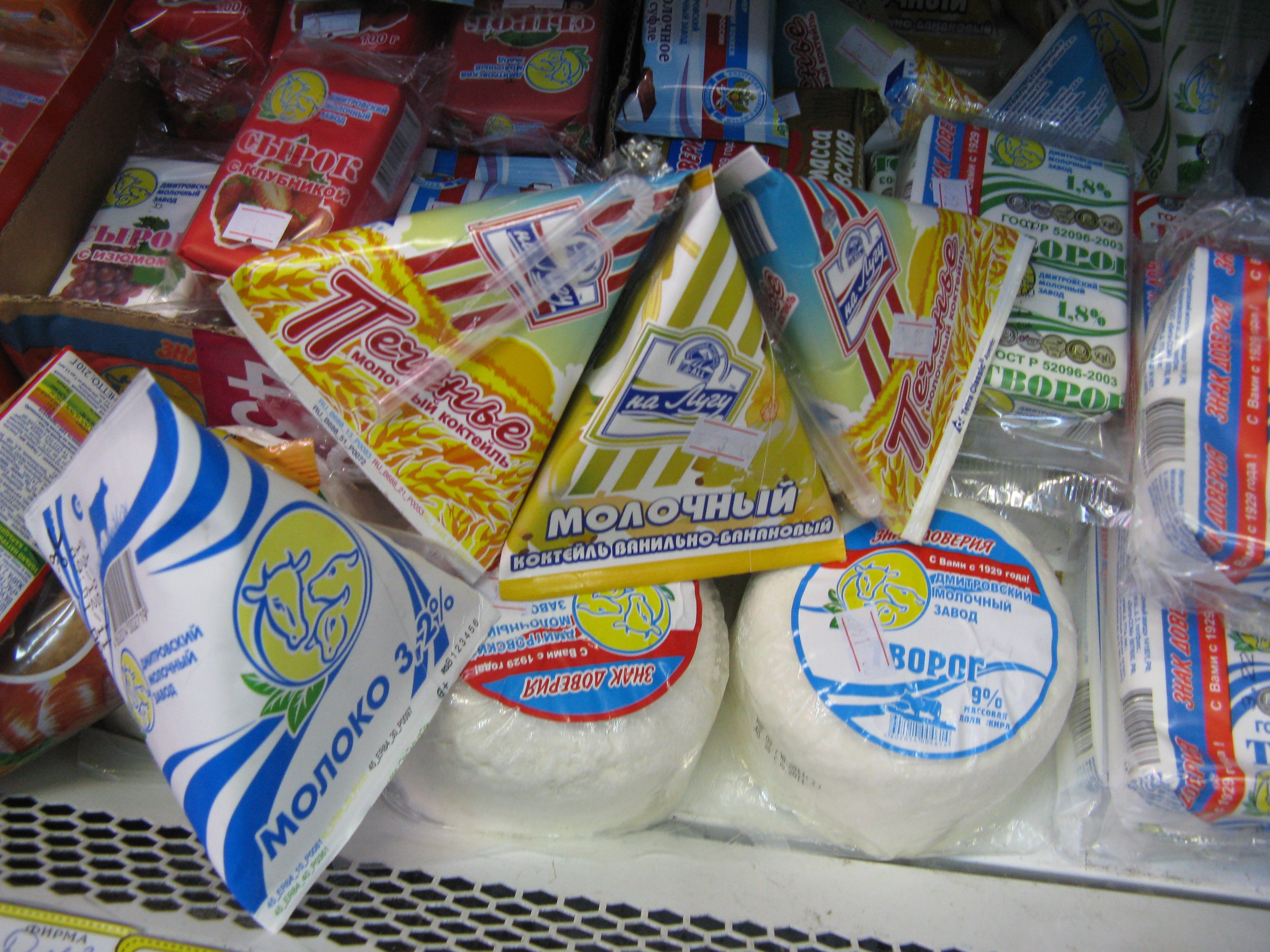
Tetrahedral packaging

Aristotle claimed that tetrahedra could fill space completely.

In 2006, Conway and Torquato showed that a packing fraction about 72% can be obtained by constructing a non-Bravais lattice packing of tetrahedra (with multiple particles with generally different orientations per repeating unit), and thus they showed that the best tetrahedron packing cannot be a lattice packing (with one particle per repeating unit such that each particle has a common orientation). These packing constructions almost doubled the optimal Bravais-lattice-packing fraction 36.73% obtained by Hoylman. In 2007 and 2010, Chaikin and coworkers experimentally showed that tetrahedron-like dice can randomly pack in a finite container up to a packing fraction between 75% and 76%. In 2008, Chen was the first to propose a packing of hard, regular tetrahedra that packed more densely than spheres, demonstrating numerically a packing fraction of 77.86%. A further improvement was made in 2009 by Torquato and Jiao, who compressed Chen's structure using a computer algorithm to a packing fraction of 78.2021%.

In mid-2009 Haji-Akbari et al. showed, using MC simulations of initially random systems that at packing densities >50% an equilibrium fluid of hard tetrahedra spontaneously transforms to a dodecagonal quasicrystal, which can be compressed to 83.24%. They also reported a glassy, disordered packing at densities exceeding 78%. For a periodic approximant to a quasicrystal with an 82-tetrahedron unit cell, they obtained a packing density as high as 85.03%.

In late 2009, a new, much simpler family of packings with a packing fraction of 85.47% was discovered by Kallus, Elser, and Gravel. These packings were also the basis of a slightly improved packing obtained by Torquato and Jiao at the end of 2009 with a packing fraction of 85.55%, and by Chen, Engel, and Glotzer in early 2010 with a packing fraction of 85.63%. The Chen, Engel and Glotzer result currently stands as the densest known packing of hard, regular tetrahedra. The quasicrystal approximant structure packs denser than this double lattice of triangular bipyramids when tetrahedra are slightly rounded (the Minkowski sum of a tetrahedron and a sphere), making the 82-tetrahedron crystal the largest unit cell for a densest packing of identical particles to date.

== Relationship to other packing problems ==
Because the earliest lower bound known for packings of tetrahedra was less than that of spheres, it was suggested that the regular tetrahedra might be a counterexample to Ulam's conjecture that the optimal density for packing congruent spheres is smaller than that for any other convex body. However, the more recent results have shown that this is not the case.

== See also ==
- Disphenoid tetrahedral honeycomb - an isohedral tessellation of 3-space by irregular tetrahedra
- Packing problem
- The triakis truncated tetrahedral honeycomb is cell-transitive and based on a regular tetrahedron
