= Packing problems =

Problems which attempt to find the most efficient way to pack objects into containers

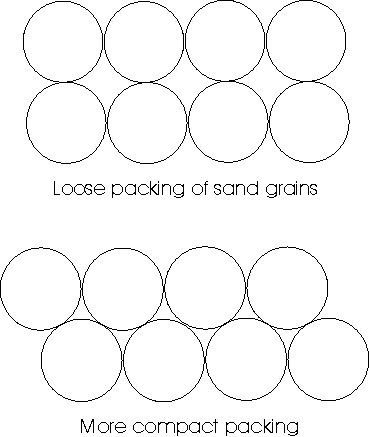
Spheres or circles packed loosely (top) and more densely (bottom)

Packing problems are a class of optimization problems in mathematics that involve attempting to pack objects together into containers. The goal is to either pack a single container as densely as possible or pack all objects using as few containers as possible. Many of these problems can be related to real-life packaging, storage and transportation issues. Each packing problem has a dual covering problem, which asks how many of the same objects are required to completely cover every region of the container, where objects are allowed to overlap.

In a bin packing problem, people are given:

- A container, usually a two- or three-dimensional convex region, possibly of infinite size. Multiple containers may be given depending on the problem.
- A set of objects, some or all of which must be packed into one or more containers. The set may contain different objects with their sizes specified, or a single object of a fixed dimension that can be used repeatedly.

Usually the packing must be without overlaps between goods and other goods or the container walls. In some variants, the aim is to find the configuration that packs a single container with the maximal packing density. More commonly, the aim is to pack all the objects into as few containers as possible. In some variants the overlapping (of objects with each other and/or with the boundary of the container) is allowed but should be minimized.

== Packing in infinite space ==
Many of these problems, when the container size is increased in all directions, become equivalent to the problem of packing objects as densely as possible in infinite Euclidean space. This problem is relevant to a number of scientific disciplines, and has received significant attention. The Kepler conjecture postulated an optimal solution for packing spheres hundreds of years before it was proven correct by Thomas Callister Hales. Many other shapes have received attention, including ellipsoids, Platonic and Archimedean solids including tetrahedra, tripods (unions of cubes along three positive axis-parallel rays), and unequal-sphere dimers.

=== Hexagonal packing of circles ===
The hexagonal packing of circles on a 2-dimensional Euclidean plane.

These problems are mathematically distinct from the ideas in the circle packing theorem. The related circle packing problem deals with packing circles, possibly of different sizes, on a surface, for instance the plane or a sphere.

The counterparts of a circle in other dimensions can never be packed with complete efficiency in dimensions larger than one (in a one-dimensional universe, the circle analogue is just two points). That is, there will always be unused space if people are only packing circles. The most efficient way of packing circles, hexagonal packing, produces approximately 91% efficiency.

=== Sphere packings in higher dimensions ===
In three dimensions, close-packed structures offer the best lattice packing of spheres, and is believed to be the optimal of all packings. With 'simple' sphere packings in three dimensions ('simple' being carefully defined) there are nine possible definable packings. The 8-dimensional E8 lattice and 24-dimensional Leech lattice have also been proven to be optimal in their respective real dimensional space.

=== Packings of Platonic solids in three dimensions ===
Cubes can easily be arranged to fill three-dimensional space completely, the most natural packing being the cubic honeycomb. No other Platonic solid can tile space on its own, but some preliminary results are known. Tetrahedra can achieve a packing of at least 85%. One of the best packings of regular dodecahedra is based on the aforementioned face-centered cubic (FCC) lattice.

Tetrahedra and octahedra together can fill all of space in an arrangement known as the tetrahedral-octahedral honeycomb.

Solid	Optimal density of a lattice packing
icosahedron	0.836357...
dodecahedron	(5 + √5)/8 = 0.904508...
octahedron	18/19 = 0.947368...

Simulations combining local improvement methods with random packings suggest that the lattice packings for icosahedra, dodecahedra, and octahedra are optimal in the broader class of all packings.

== Packing in 3-dimensional containers ==
Packing nine L tricubes into a cube

=== Different cuboids into a cuboid ===
Determine the minimum number of cuboid containers (bins) that are required to pack a given set of item cuboids. The rectangular cuboids to be packed can be rotated by 90 degrees on each axis.

=== Spheres into a Euclidean ball ===
The problem of finding the smallest ball such that k disjoint open unit balls may be packed inside it has a simple and complete answer in n-dimensional Euclidean space if $k \leq n+1$, and in an infinite-dimensional Hilbert space with no restrictions. It is worth describing in detail here, to give a flavor of the general problem. In this case, a configuration of k pairwise tangent unit balls is available. People place the centers at the vertices $a_1, \dots, a_k$ of a regular $(k-1)$ dimensional simplex with edge 2; this is easily realized starting from an orthonormal basis. A small computation shows that the distance of each vertex from the barycenter is $\sqrt{2\big(1-\frac{1}{k} \big)}$. Moreover, any other point of the space necessarily has a larger distance from at least one of the k vertices. In terms of inclusions of balls, the k open unit balls centered at $a_1, \dots, a_k$ are included in a ball of radius $r_k := 1+\sqrt{2\big(1-\frac{1}{k}\big)}$, which is minimal for this configuration.

To show that this configuration is optimal, let $x_1, \dots, x_k$ be the centers of k disjoint open unit balls contained in a ball of radius r centered at a point $x_0$. Consider the map from the finite set $\{x_1,\dots,x_k\}$ into $\{a_1,\dots,a_k\}$ taking $x_j$ in the corresponding $a_j$ for each $1 \leq j \leq k$. Since for all $1 \leq i < j \leq k$, $\|a_i-a_j\| = 2\leq\|x_i-x_j\|$ this map is 1-Lipschitz and by the Kirszbraun theorem it extends to a 1-Lipschitz map that is globally defined; in particular, there exists a point $a_0$ such that for all $1\leq j\leq k$ one has $\|a_0-a_j\| \leq \|x_0-x_j\|$, so that also $r_k\leq 1+\|a_0-a_j\|\leq 1+\|x_0-x_j\| \leq r$. This shows that there are k disjoint unit open balls in a ball of radius r if and only if $r \geq r_k$. Notice that in an infinite-dimensional Hilbert space this implies that there are infinitely many disjoint open unit balls inside a ball of radius r if and only if $r\geq 1+\sqrt{2}$. For instance, the unit balls centered at $\sqrt{2}e_j$, where $\{e_j\}_j$ is an orthonormal basis, are disjoint and included in a ball of radius $1 + \sqrt{2}$ centered at the origin. Moreover, for $r < 1 + \sqrt{2}$, the maximum number of disjoint open unit balls inside a ball of radius r is
$$\left\lfloor \frac{2}{2-(r-1)^2}\right\rfloor.$$

=== Spheres in a cuboid ===
People determine the number of spherical objects of given diameter d that can be packed into a cuboid of size $a \times b \times c$.

=== Identical spheres in a cylinder ===
People determine the minimum height h of a cylinder with given radius R that will pack n identical spheres of radius r (< R). For a small radius R the spheres arrange to ordered structures, called columnar structures.

=== Polyhedra in spheres ===
People determine the minimum radius R that will pack n identical, unit volume polyhedra of a given shape.

== Packing in 2-dimensional containers ==
The optimal packing of 10 circles in a circle

Many variants of 2-dimensional packing problems have been studied.

=== Packing of circles ===
People are given n unit circles, and have to pack them in the smallest possible container. Several kinds of containers have been studied:

- Packing circles in a circle - closely related to spreading points in a unit circle with the objective of finding the greatest minimal separation, d_{n}, between points. Optimal solutions have been proven for n ≤ 14, and n = 19.
- Packing circles in a square - closely related to spreading points in a unit square with the objective of finding the greatest minimal separation, d_{n}, between points. To convert between these two formulations of the problem, the square side for unit circles will be $L = 2 + 2/d_n$.
  The optimal packing of 15 circles in a square
  Optimal solutions have been proven for n ≤ 30.
- Packing circles in a rectangle
- Packing circles in an isosceles right triangle - good estimates are known for n < 300.
- Packing circles in an equilateral triangle - Optimal solutions are known for n ≤ 15, and conjectures are available for n ≤ 34.

=== Packing of squares ===
People are given n unit squares and have to pack them into the smallest possible container, where the container type varies:

- Packing squares in a square: Optimal solutions have been proven for n from 1-10, 14-16, 22-25, 33-36, 62-64, 79-81, 98-100, and any square integer. The wasted space is asymptotically O(a^{3/5}).
- Packing squares in a circle: Good solutions are known for n ≤ 35.
  The optimal packing of 10 squares in a square

=== Packing of rectangles ===
- Packing identical rectangles in a rectangle: The problem of packing multiple instances of a single rectangle of size (l,w), allowing for 90° rotation, in a bigger rectangle of size (L,W ) has some applications such as loading of boxes on pallets and, specifically, woodpulp stowage. For example, it is possible to pack 147 rectangles of size (137,95) in a rectangle of size (1600,1230).
- Packing different rectangles in a rectangle: The problem of packing multiple rectangles of varying widths and heights in an enclosing rectangle of minimum area (but with no boundaries on the enclosing rectangle's width or height) has an important application in combining images into a single larger image. A web page that loads a single larger image often renders faster in the browser than the same page loading multiple small images, due to the overhead involved in requesting each image from the web server. The problem is NP-complete in general, but there are fast algorithms for solving small instances.

== Related fields ==
In tiling or tessellation problems, there are to be no gaps, nor overlaps. Many of the puzzles of this type involve packing rectangles or polyominoes into a larger rectangle or other square-like shape.

There are significant theorems on tiling rectangles (and cuboids) in rectangles (cuboids) with no gaps or overlaps:

An a × b rectangle can be packed with 1 × n strips if and only if n divides a or n divides b.
de Bruijn's theorem: A box can be packed with a harmonic brick a × a b × a b c if the box has dimensions a p × a b q × a b c r for some natural numbers p, q, r (i.e., the box is a multiple of the brick.)

The study of polyomino tilings largely concerns two classes of problems: to tile a rectangle with congruent tiles, and to pack one of each n-omino into a rectangle.

A classic puzzle of the second kind is to arrange all twelve pentominoes into rectangles sized 3×20, 4×15, 5×12 or 6×10.

== Packing of irregular objects ==
Packing of irregular objects is a problem not lending itself well to closed form solutions; however, the applicability to practical environmental science is quite important. For example, irregularly shaped soil particles pack differently as the sizes and shapes vary, leading to important outcomes for plant species to adapt root formations and to allow water movement in the soil.

The problem of deciding whether a given set of polygons can fit in a given square container has been shown to be complete for the existential theory of the reals.

== See also ==
- Bin packing problem
- Close-packing of equal spheres
- Conway puzzle
- Covering problem
- Cutting stock problem
- Ellipsoid packing
- Kissing number problem
- Knapsack problem
- Random close pack
- Set packing
- Slothouber–Graatsma puzzle
- Strip packing problem
- Tetrahedron packing
- Tetris
