= Circle packing in a circle =

Two-dimensional packing problem

Circle packing in a circle is a two-dimensional packing problem with the objective of packing unit circles into the smallest possible larger circle.

== Table of solutions, 1 ≤ n ≤ 20 ==
If more than one optimal solution exists, all are shown.

| $n$ | Enclosing circle radius $r$ | Density $n\!/r^2$ | Optimality | Layout(s) of the $n$ circles |
|---|---|---|---|---|
| 1 | 1 | 1.0 | Trivially optimal. | |
| 2 | 2 | 0.5 | Trivially optimal. | |
| 3 | 2.155... $1+\frac{2}{\sqrt{3}}$ | 0.6461... | Trivially optimal. | |
| 4 | 2.414... $1+\sqrt{2}$ | 0.6864... | Trivially optimal. | |
| 5 | 2.701... $1+\sqrt{2\left(1+\frac{1}{\sqrt{5}}\right)}$ | 0.6854... | Proved optimal by Graham (1968) | |
| 6 | 3 | 0.6666... | Proved optimal by Graham (1968) | |
| 7 | 3 | 0.7777... | Trivially optimal. | |
| 8 | 3.304... $1+\frac{1}{\sin\frac{\pi}{7}}$ | 0.7328... | Proved optimal by Pirl (1969) | |
| 9 | 3.613... $1+\sqrt{2\left(2+\sqrt{2}\right)}$ | 0.6895... | Proved optimal by Pirl (1969) | |
| 10 | 3.813... | 0.6878... | Proved optimal by Pirl (1969) | |
| 11 | 3.923... $1+\frac{1}{\sin\frac{\pi}{9}}$ | 0.7148... | Proved optimal by Melissen (1994) | |
| 12 | 4.029... | 0.7392... | Proved optimal by Fodor (2000) | |
| 13 | 4.236... $2 + \sqrt{5}$ | 0.7245... | Proved optimal by Fodor (2003) | |
| 14 | 4.328... | 0.7474... | Proved optimal by Ekanayake and LaFountain (2024). | |
| 15 | 4.521... $1\!+\!\sqrt{6\!+\!\frac{2}{\sqrt{5}}\!+\!4 \sqrt{1\!+\!\frac{2}{\sqrt{5}}}}$ | 0.7339... | Conjectured optimal by Pirl (1969). | |
| 16 | 4.615... | 0.7512... | Conjectured optimal by Goldberg (1971). | |
| 17 | 4.792... | 0.7403... | Conjectured optimal by Reis (1975). | |
| 18 | 4.863... $1+\sqrt{2}+\sqrt{6}$ | 0.7609... | Conjectured optimal by Pirl (1969), with additional arrangements by Graham, Lubachevsky, Nurmela, and Östergård (1998). | |
| 19 | 4.863... $1+\sqrt{2}+\sqrt{6}$ | 0.8032... | Proved optimal by Fodor (1999) | |
| 20 | 5.122... | 0.7623... | Conjectured optimal by Goldberg (1971). | |

== Special cases ==
Only 26 optimal packings are thought to be rigid (with no circles able to "rattle"). Numbers in bold are prime:

- Proven for n = 1, **2**, **3**, 4, **5**, 6, **7**, 10, **11**, 12, **13**, 14, **19**
- Conjectured for n = 15, 16, **17**, 18, 22, **23**, 27, 30, **31**, 33, **37**, **61**, 91

Of these, solutions for n = 2, 3, 4, 7, 19, and 37 achieve a packing density greater than any smaller number > 1. (Higher density records all have rattles.)

== See also ==
- Disk covering problem
- Square packing in a circle
