= Square packing =

Two-dimensional packing problem

Square packing is a packing problem where the objective is to determine how many congruent squares can be packed into some larger shape, often a square or circle.

== In a square ==
Square packing in a square is the problem of determining the maximum number of unit squares (squares of side length one) that can be packed inside a larger square of side length $a$. If $a$ is an integer, the answer is $a^2,$ but the precise – or even asymptotic – amount of unfilled space for an arbitrary non-integer $a$ is an open question.

5 unit squares in a square of side length $2+1/\sqrt{2}\approx 2.707$

10 unit squares in a square of side length $3+1/\sqrt{2}\approx 3.707$

11 unit squares in a square of side length $a\approx 3.877084$

The smallest value of $a$ that allows the packing of $n$ unit squares is known when $n$ is a perfect square, one less than a perfect square, or two less than a perfect square, as well as for $n$ equal to 5, 6, 10, 11, 13, and 46. For all of these numbers except 5, 10, and 11, the packing is the natural one with axis-aligned squares, and the optimal value of $a$ is $\lceil\sqrt{n}\,\rceil$, where $\lceil\,\ \rceil$ is the ceiling (round up) function. The figure shows the optimal packings for 5 and 10 squares, the two smallest numbers of squares for which the optimal packing involves tilted squares.

The smallest unresolved case is $n=12$. It is known that 12 unit squares cannot be packed in a square of side length less than $\textstyle \frac{7943}{2000} = 3.9715$. By contrast, the tightest known packing of 12 squares is inside a square of side length 4, in three rows of four. The optimal packing for $n=11$ was shown on September 29, 2026 in an AI-assisted proof to be approximately 3.877084, using Walter Trump's original packing from 1979.

The smallest case where the best known packing involves squares at three different angles is $n=17$. It was discovered in 1998 by John Bidwell, an undergraduate student at the University of Hawaiʻi, and has side length $a\approx 4.6756$.

A mutilated chessboard, an optimal packing for n^{2} − 2 squares

Below are the minimum solutions for values up to $n = 16$; the case $n=12$ remains unresolved.

Number of unit squares $n$	Minimal side length $a$ of big square
1	1
2, 3, 4	2
5	$2+\frac{\sqrt{2}}{2} \approx 2.707\ldots$
6, 7, 8, 9	3
10	$3+\frac{\sqrt{2}}{2} \approx 3.707\ldots$
11	$3.877\ldots$
12, ..., 16	4

Some numbers of unit squares are never the optimal number in a packing. In particular, if a square of size $a\times a$ allows the packing of $n^2-2$ unit squares, then it must be the case that $a\ge n$ and that a packing of $n^2$ unit squares is also possible.

=== Asymptotic results ===
Unsolved problem in mathematics
What is the asymptotic growth rate of wasted space for square packing in a half-integer square?
More unsolved problems in mathematics

For larger values of the side length $a$, the exact number of unit squares that can pack an $a\times a$ square remains unknown. It is always possible to pack a $\lfloor a\rfloor \!\times\! \lfloor a\rfloor$ grid of axis-aligned unit squares, but this may leave a large area, approximately $2a(a-\lfloor a\rfloor)$, uncovered and wasted. Instead, Paul Erdős and Ronald Graham showed that for a different packing by tilted unit squares, the wasted space could be significantly reduced to $O(a^{7/11}) \subseteq o(a^{0.637})$ (the latter written in little o notation). Later, Graham and Fan Chung further reduced the wasted space to $O(a^{0.631})$, and subsequent work reduced the wasted space to $O(a^{0.625})$, and then $O(a^{0.6})$. However, as Klaus Roth and Bob Vaughan proved, all solutions must waste space at least $\Omega\bigl((a \cdot |a-\operatorname{round} a|)^{1/2}\bigr)$. In particular, when $a$ is a half-integer, the wasted space is at least proportional to its square root. The precise asymptotic growth rate of the wasted space, even for half-integer side lengths, remains an open problem.

== In a circle ==
Square packing in a circle is a related problem of packing n unit squares into a circle with radius as small as possible. For this problem, good solutions are published for n up to 50. Here are the minimum known solutions for up to $n = 12$ (although only the cases from $n = 1$ to $7$ are proven to be optimal):

Number of squares	Circle radius
1	$\sqrt{2}/2 \approx 0.707\ldots$
2	$\sqrt{5}/2 \approx 1.118\ldots$
3	$5\sqrt{17}/16 \approx 1.288\ldots$
4	$\sqrt{2} \approx 1.414\ldots$
5	$\sqrt{10}/2 \approx 1.581\ldots$
6	1.688...
7	$\sqrt{13}/2 \approx 1.802\ldots$
8	1.978...
9	$\sqrt{1105}/16 \approx 2.077\ldots$
10	$3\sqrt{2}/2 \approx 2.121\ldots$
11	2.214...
12	$\sqrt{5} \approx 2.236\ldots$

== In other shapes ==
Packing squares into other shapes can have high computational complexity: testing whether a given number of axis-parallel unit squares can fit into a given polygon is NP-complete. It remains NP-complete even for a simple polygon (with no holes) that is orthogonally convex, with axis-parallel sides, and with half-integer vertex coordinates.

== See also ==
- Circle packing in a square
- Squaring the square
- Rectangle packing
- Moving sofa problem
