= Circle packing in an isosceles right triangle =

Two-dimensional packing problem

Circle packing in a right isosceles triangle is a packing problem where the objective is to pack n unit circles into the smallest possible isosceles right triangle.

Minimum solutions (lengths shown are length of leg) are shown in the table below. Solutions to the equivalent problem of maximizing the minimum distance between n points in an isosceles right triangle, were known to be optimal for n < 8 and were extended up to n = 10.

In 2011 a heuristic algorithm found 18 improvements on previously known optima, the smallest of which was for n = 13.

Number of circles	Length
1	$2 + \sqrt {2}$ = 3.414...
2	$2 \sqrt {2}$ = 4.828...
3	$4 + \sqrt {2}$ = 5.414...
4	$2 + 3\sqrt {2}$ = 6.242...
5	$4 + \sqrt {2} + \sqrt{3}$ = 7.146...
6	$6 + \sqrt {2}$ = 7.414...
7	$4 + \sqrt {2} + \sqrt {2 + 4 \sqrt{2}}$ = 8.181...
8	$2 + 3 \sqrt {2} + \sqrt{6}$ = 8.692...
9	$2 + 5 \sqrt {2}$ = 9.071...
10	$8 + \sqrt {2}$ = 9.414...
11	$5 + 3 \sqrt {2} + \dfrac {1} {3} \sqrt {6}$ = 10.059...
12	10.422...
13	10.798...
14	$2 + 3 \sqrt {2} + 2 \sqrt{6}$ = 11.141...
15	$10 + \sqrt {2}$ = 11.414...
