= Incidence and Symmetry in Design and Architecture =

Non-fiction book

- Authors: Jenny Baglivo, Jack E. Graver
- Language: English
- Series: Cambridge Urban and Architectural Studies
- Subject: Applications of symmetry and graph theory in architecture
- Publisher: Cambridge University Press
- Publication date: 1983
- Pages: 306
- ISBN: 9780521297844

Incidence and Symmetry in Design and Architecture is a book on symmetry, graph theory, and their applications in architecture, aimed at architecture students. It was written by Jenny Baglivo and Jack E. Graver and published in 1983 by Cambridge University Press in their Cambridge Urban and Architectural Studies book series. It won an Alpha Sigma Nu Book Award in 1983, and has been recommended for undergraduate mathematics libraries by the Basic Library List Committee of the Mathematical Association of America.

== Topics ==
Incidence and Symmetry in Design and Architecture is divided into two parts of roughly equal length, each divided into four chapters. The first part, "Incidence", is primarily on graph theory. Its topics include the basic definitions of directed graphs and undirected graphs, homeomorphisms of graphs, Dijkstra's algorithm for the shortest path problem, planar graphs, polyhedral graphs, and Euler's polyhedral formula. This theory is applied to the grid bracing problem in structural rigidity, where the authors derive a novel equivalence between stabilizing a square grid by cross bracing and the strong connectivity augmentation of directed bipartite graphs. Other applications include optimal route design for facilities such as roads and power lines, the connectivity of floor plans of buildings, and the arrangement of building corridors to optimize average distance. This part of the book concludes with a treatment of the classification of two-dimensional topological surfaces.

The second part of the book is "Symmetry". Its first chapter includes the basic definitions of group theory and of a Euclidean plane isometry, and the classification of isometries into translations, rotations, reflections, and glide reflections. The second of its chapters concerns the discrete isometry groups in the plane including the frieze groups and wallpaper groups, and the classification of two-dimensional patterns by their symmetries. Another chapter provides some partial generalizations of this material into three dimensions, and the final chapter of this part concerns connections between group theory and problems of counting combinatorial objects, including Lagrange's theorem on the divisibility of orders of groups and their subgroups, and Burnside's lemma on the number of orbits of a group action.

== Audience and reception ==
The book is aimed at architecture and design students not already familiar with mathematics, and is self-contained although not always easy going. It includes many exercises and experiments, some of which involve paper folding or the uses of mirrors rather than being purely mathematical, and are often aimed at practical applications. Reviewer C. F. Earl strongly recommends the book to "students, practitioners, and researchers in architecture and design who wish to understand the properties of their designs and the possibilities for new designs". Ethan Bolker suggests that it could also be used by secondary school teachers wishing to brush up their background knowledge of mathematics, or as a textbook for an undergraduate course on mathematics for liberal arts students.
