= Covering (construction) =

Exterior layer of a building

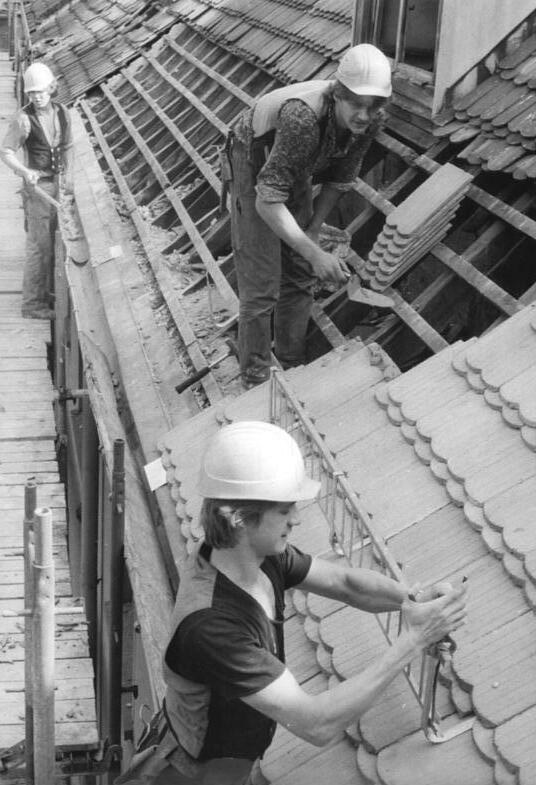
Roofers in Germany,

In construction, covering is the exterior layer of a building's roof. The covering ensures waterproofing by directing and collecting rainwater. It also provides mechanical protection against various external elements such as dust and intrusions. Additionally, it must withstand static mechanical pressures from snow and dynamic forces from strong winds (pressure and uplift).

Considered as the fifth facade of the building, it also contributes to the aesthetic appeal and character of the structure.

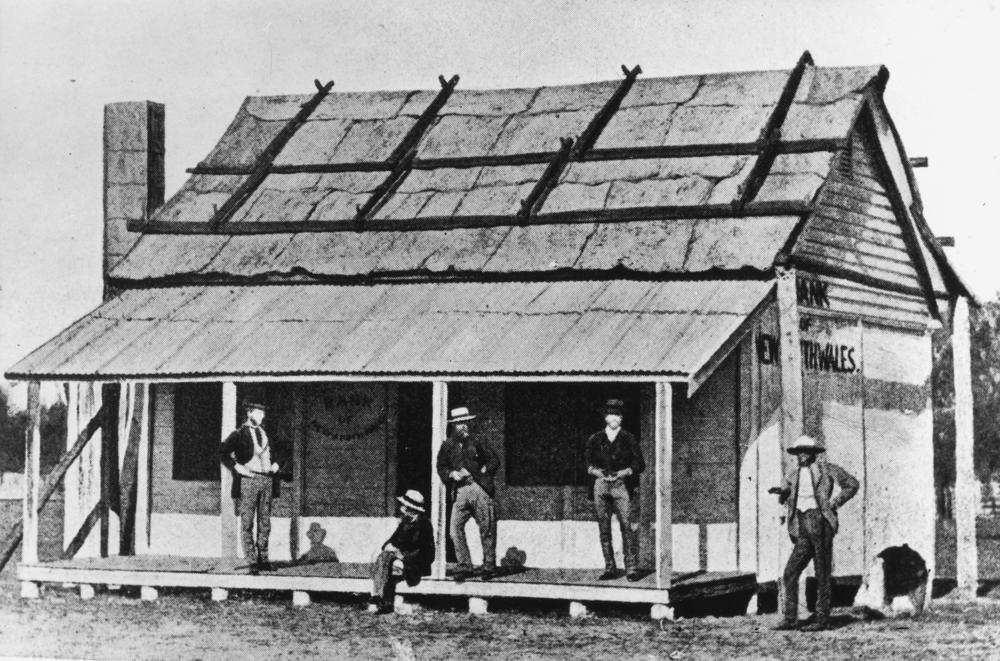
Building of the Bank of New South Wales in St George in 1874: it is covered in bark and its veranda in corrugated iron.

== Functions ==
The roof covering is the exterior part of the roof and does not contribute to the building's stability. It is designed to endure all weather conditions such as rain, snow, hail, and wind, as well as external environmental factors like marine environments and the weight of maintenance personnel. From the ridge to the drainage system, the roof covering directs rainwater by gravity and contributes to waterproofing.

As a visible element from the outside, the roof covering contributes to the heritage and architectural value of the building.

== Composition ==
A roof covering is composed of various elements including:

- Roof support (beams, boards, rafters, battens, etc.)
- Roof underlayment (waterproof membrane, thermal insulation, etc.)
- Ventilation elements for the underlayment (moisture and vapor evacuation)
- Roof covering, visible exterior coating (tiles, slates, shingles, etc.)
- Elements ensuring rainproofing and proper drainage of the roof (ridge caps, flashing, edge waterproofing elements, etc.)
- A water collection system (eaves) and rainwater drainage (gutters)
- Roof windows or skylights.

=== Roof underlayment ===
The roof underlayment is used to prevent accidental penetration of rainwater or powdery snow, to prevent convective exchanges with thermal insulation, and to control the migration of water vapor. It is an element of the building's thermal performance.

The roof underlayment is placed between the frame and the roof support. Two types of underlayments are distinguished: rigid underlayments, usually made of wood such as panels and boards, and flexible underlayments made of bituminous material or synthetic material, reinforced or not. Flexible underlayments can have High Vapor Permeability (HVP), which affects water vapor migration and also impacts the installation of thermal insulation.

=== Roof support ===
The roof support, attached to the frame, serves as a fixing support for the roof elements. It is usually a lathing or boarding. Lathing is a network of horizontal wooden slats, square or rectangular in section, called battens. In the presence of a flexible underlayment, counter-battens are placed under the lathing. Boarding consists of a decking of boards, which are wooden planks. Alternative industrial solutions, such as fiber cement, exist. Some roofing elements, such as steel roofing or slate, do not require roof support.

=== Ventilation ===
Roof ventilation ensures the proper preservation of the timber in the attic and regulates the humidity level by preventing condensation. Two ventilation systems are distinguished:

- The ridge vent system consists of punctual openings (generally with a 1 dm2 section) arranged to facilitate air circulation. These are placed at the bottom of the windward slopes (in areas of positive pressure) and at the top of the leeward slopes (in areas of negative pressure).
- The linear system allows air to pass at the base of the roof (at the eaves), along the slopes, and at the ridge. It is mandatory in mountainous areas and has the advantage, especially with underlayment, of homogenizing ventilation.

=== Roofing elements ===
Technologically, two types of installations are distinguished: roofing with small elements and roofing with large elements. Roofing with small elements includes slates, tiles, and shingles. The principle of waterproofing guiding their installation is overlapping. Roofing with large elements includes sheet metals, profiled metal or plastic trays, and corrugated fiber-cement sheets. Their waterproofing principles may involve overlapping, stapling, the application of elastomer seals, etc.

Some traditional roofing materials, such as thatch or green roofs, do not fit into these two categories.

==== Tiles ====
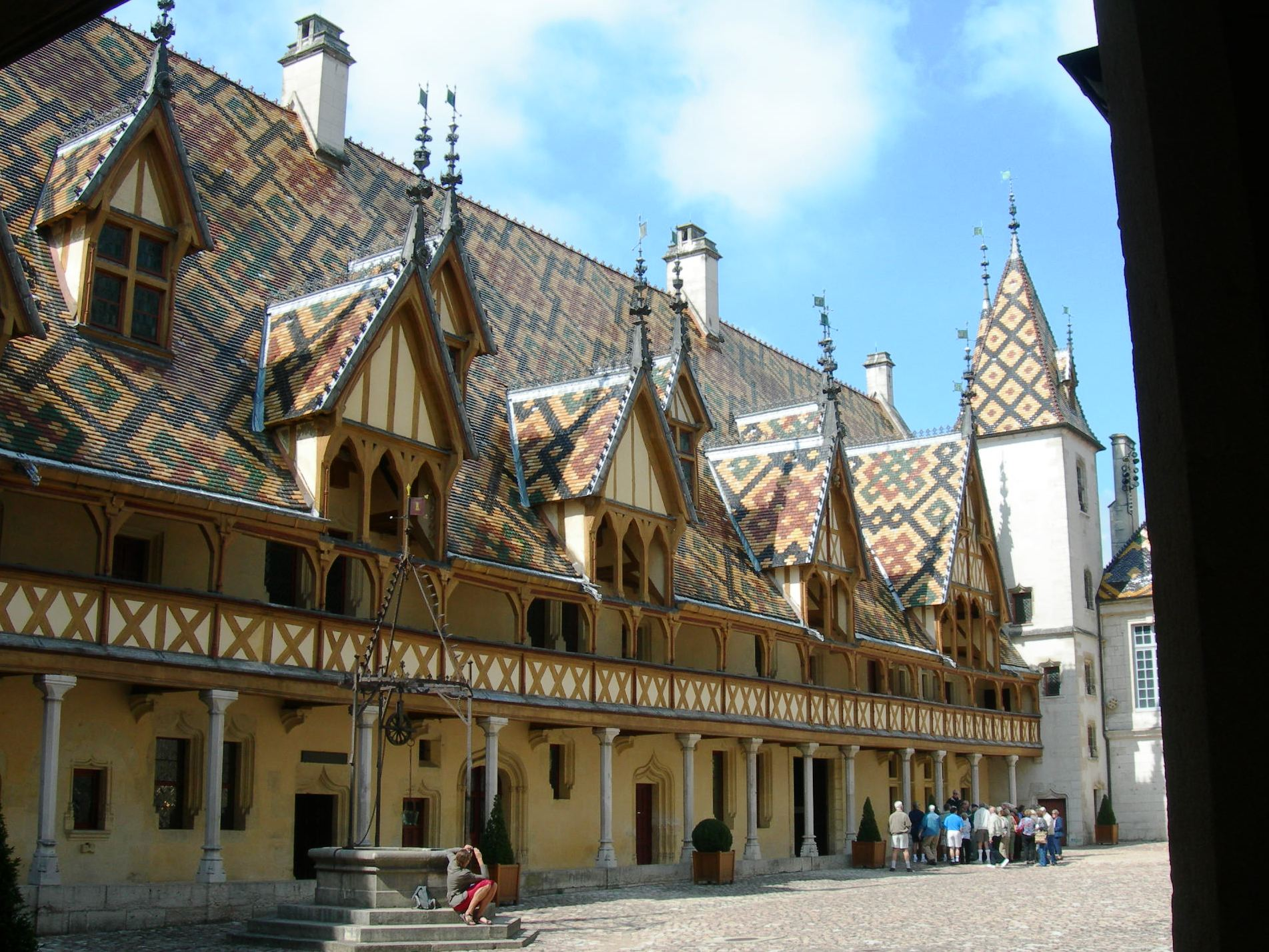
Roof with glazed tiles of the Hospices de Beaune.

Tiles are rigid plates manufactured by molding or pressing. They come in various shapes depending on regional specifics or their location on the roof: flat, corrugated, curved, and saddleback. The material is often terracotta, but it can also be concrete, glass, or metal (zinc, steel). They can be installed on lathing or boarding, or even on specific tile supports.

Terracotta tiles represent the primary roofing material in France and many other countries. These elements are made of clay fired at high temperatures. The obtained colors depend on the clay used and the surface treatment applied during finishing.

Several types of tiles, each with their relative installation specifics based on their shape, exist, such as the canal tile, flat tile (with regional variations like the glazed tile from Burgundy or the Alsatian tile), Flemish tile, or interlocking tile.

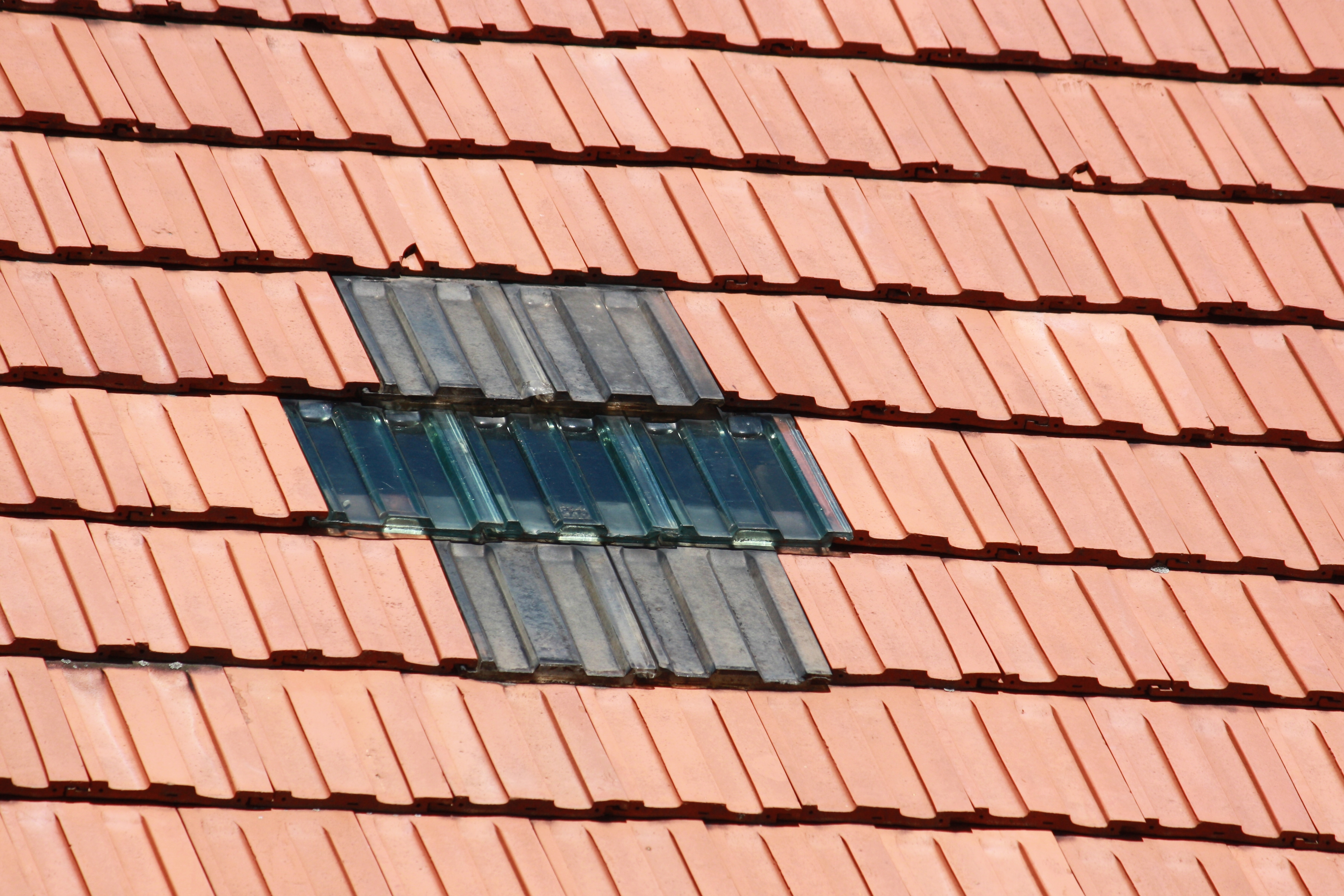
Glass and clay tiles in the Czech Republic.

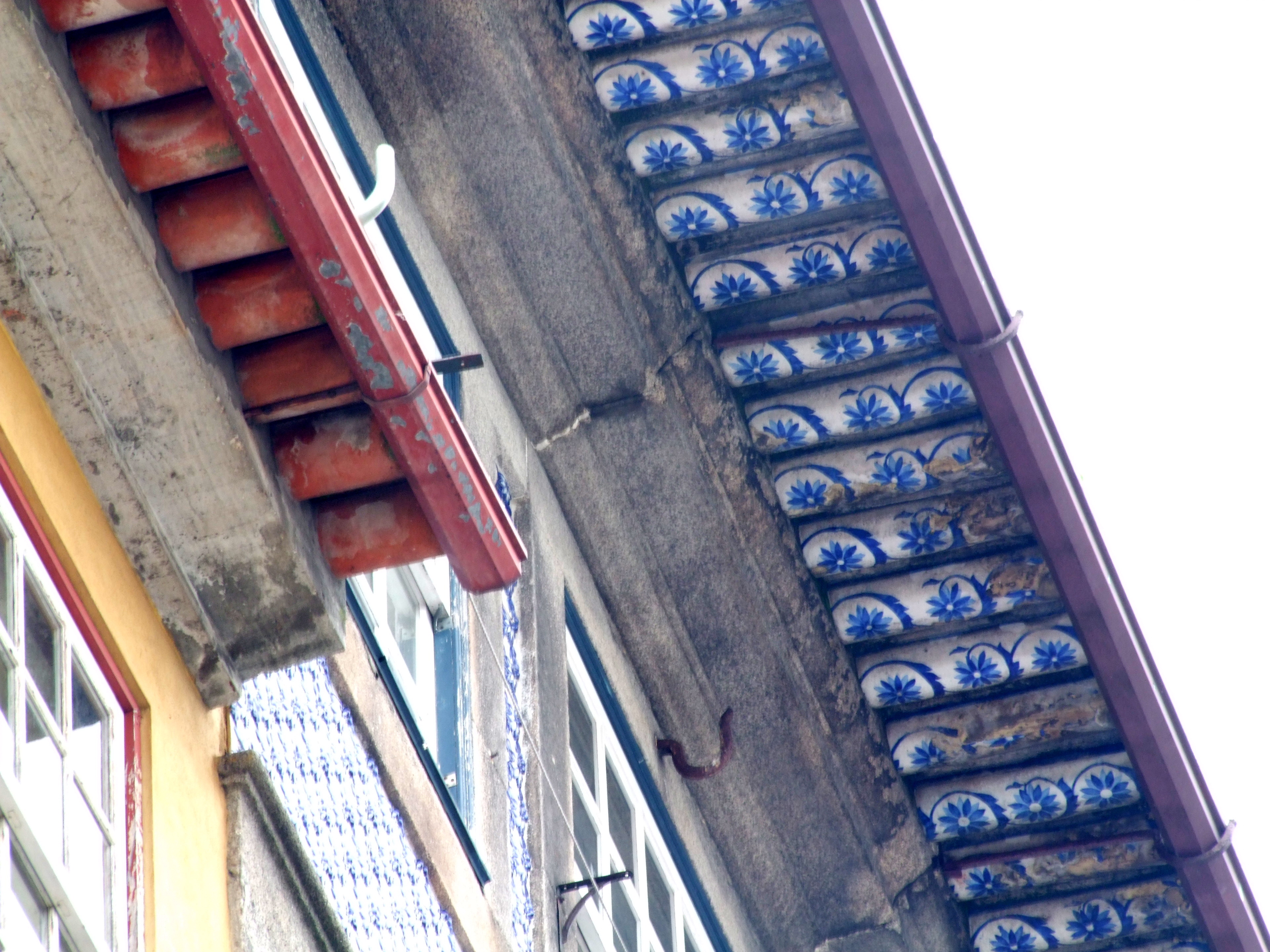
Porcelain tiles in Portugal.

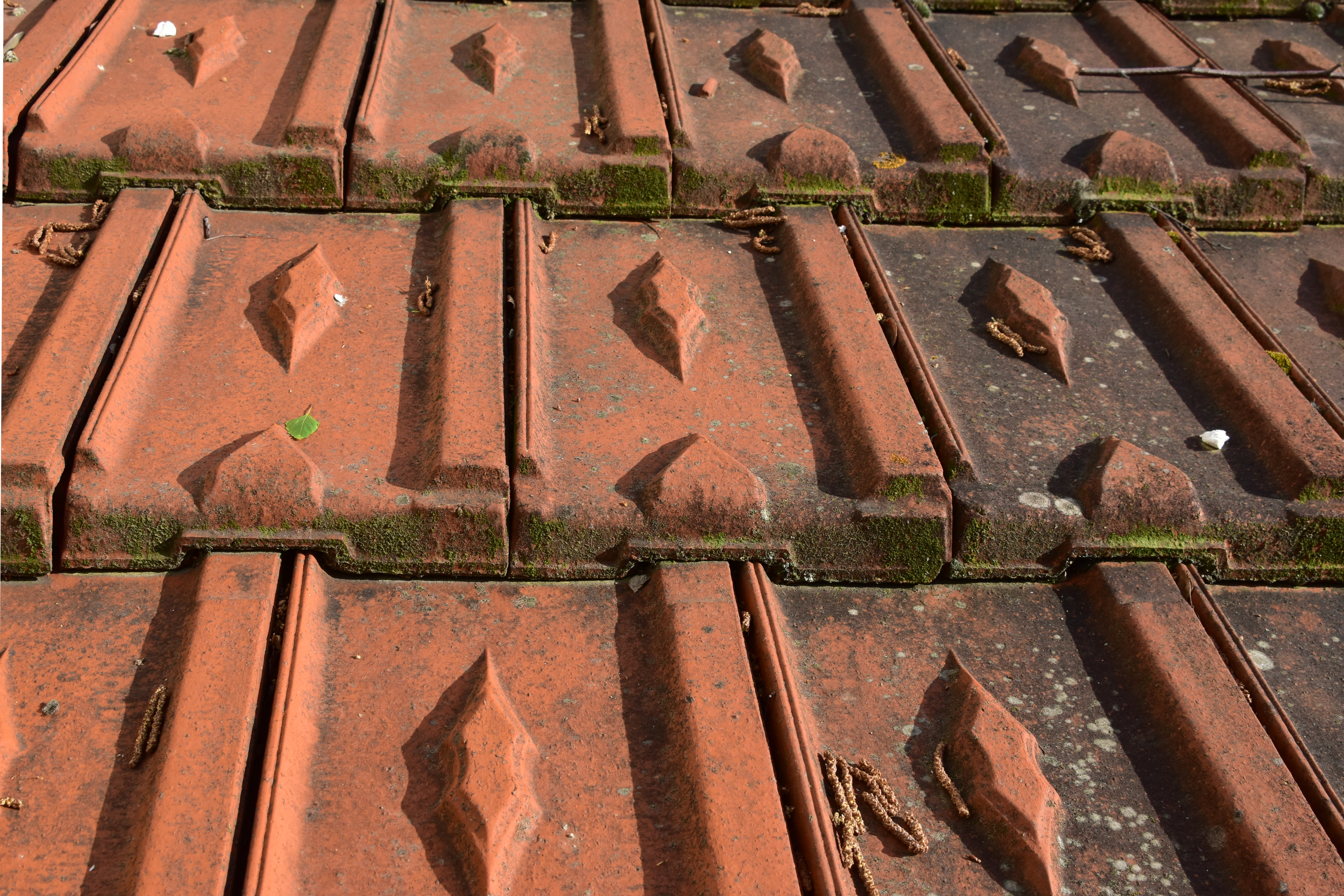
Interlocking tiles with a diamond-shaped pattern.

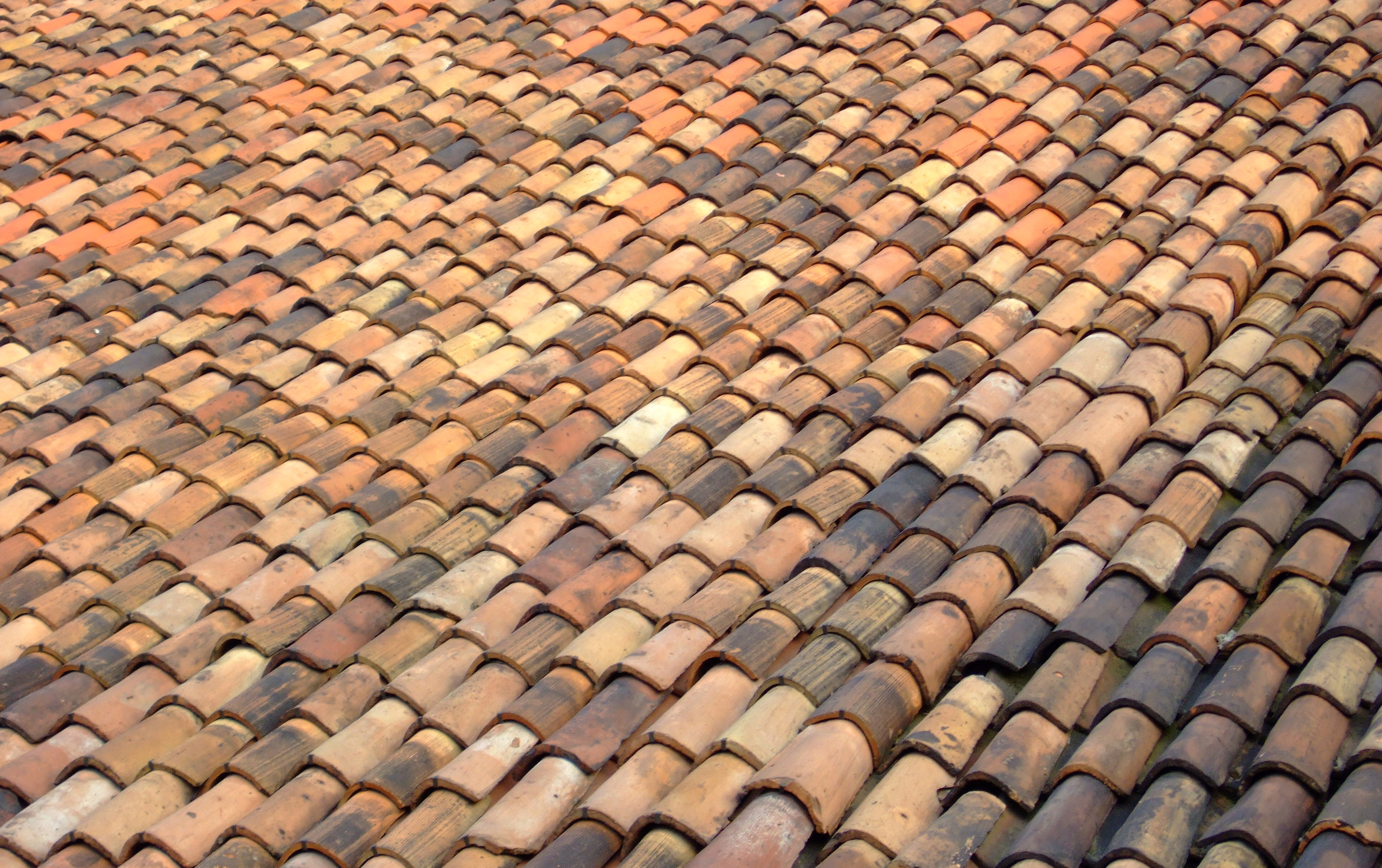
Tile roof in Milan.

==== Slates ====
Natural slates are elements made of very fine schist stone. They are manufactured from slate schist, cut and sawn to the desired dimension. Slate shapes include rectangular, rounded, pointed, or diamond-shaped. A slate is waterproof, non-porous, frost-resistant, and resistant to the most aggressive atmospheric agents.

Fiber-cement slates are prefabricated elements made of cement to resemble natural slates. They can be pigmented throughout or surface-colored. The early fiber-cement slates contained asbestos.

The geographical distribution of slate roofs is linked to the shale richness of the subsoil: Anjou, Brittany, Ardennes, certain parts of the Pyrenees, and the Massif Central in France. In Europe, natural slates usually come from Spain.

Slates are installed with hooks or nails. Two types of supports can be used: battens or boarding (also known as continuous support).

==== Bituminous shingles ====
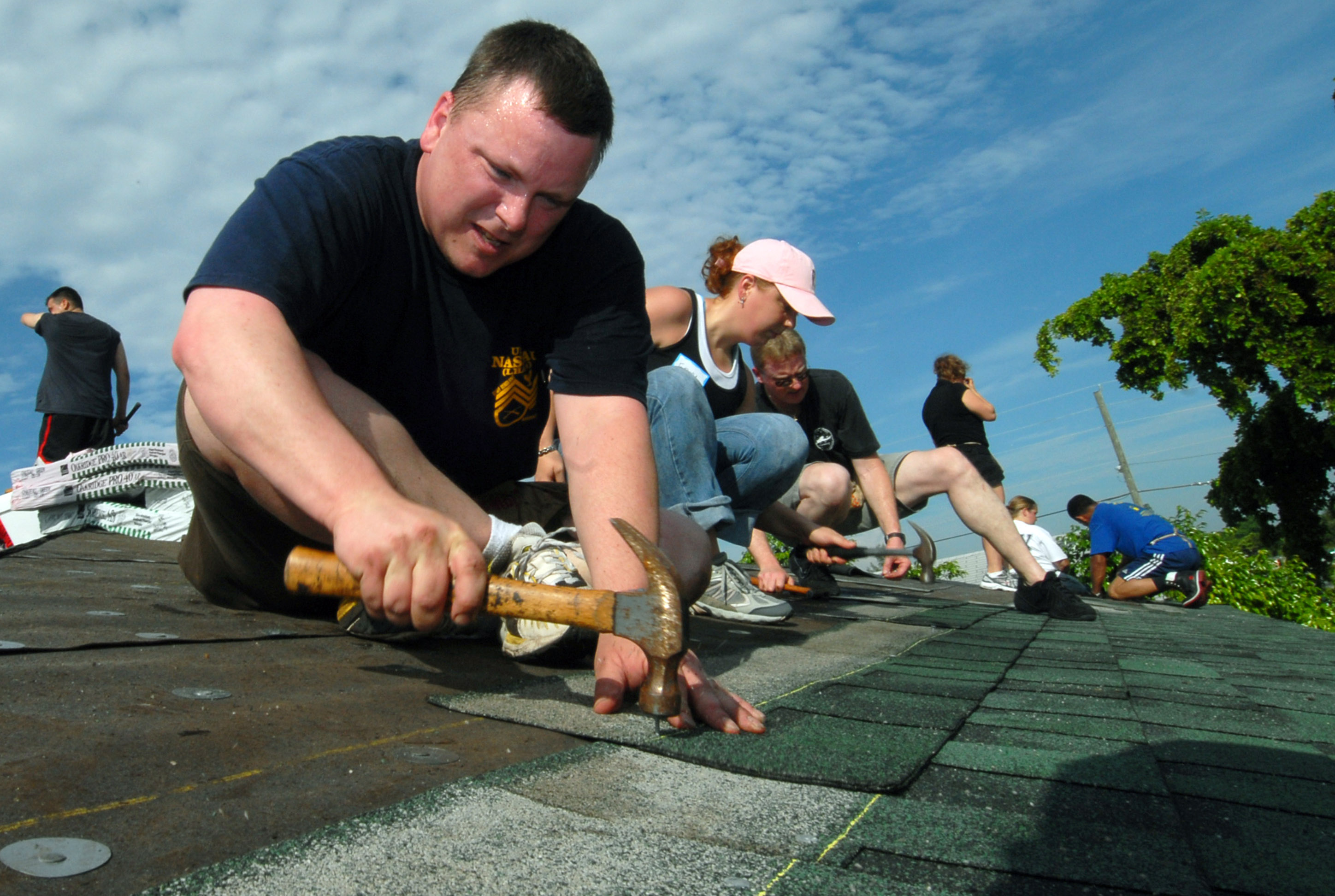
Collective installation of asphalt shingles, United States.

Bituminous shingles, also called "shingles," consist of a fiberglass or cellulose felt reinforcement and a mixture of bitumen and mineral granules. Various shapes are available: rounded, rectangular, and scale-like. These products are easily installed on low-slope roofs and lightweight structures due to their low weight. The most common installation method is nailing the elements to a continuous support, made of particle boards or continuous boarding.

==== Wooden shingles ====
Roofs made of wooden shingles, also called wooden scales or shingles, are made of larch, chestnut, or red cedar. They represent an ancient technique still found in Franche-Comté, the Vosges, or Savoie. Small wooden elements are nailed in place, similar to slates. Here again, some artisans perpetuate and revive this technique, mainly found in mountainous areas but also in plains. The virtually decay-resistant wood gradually changes color over time to blend into silver-gray hues.

==== Lauzes ====
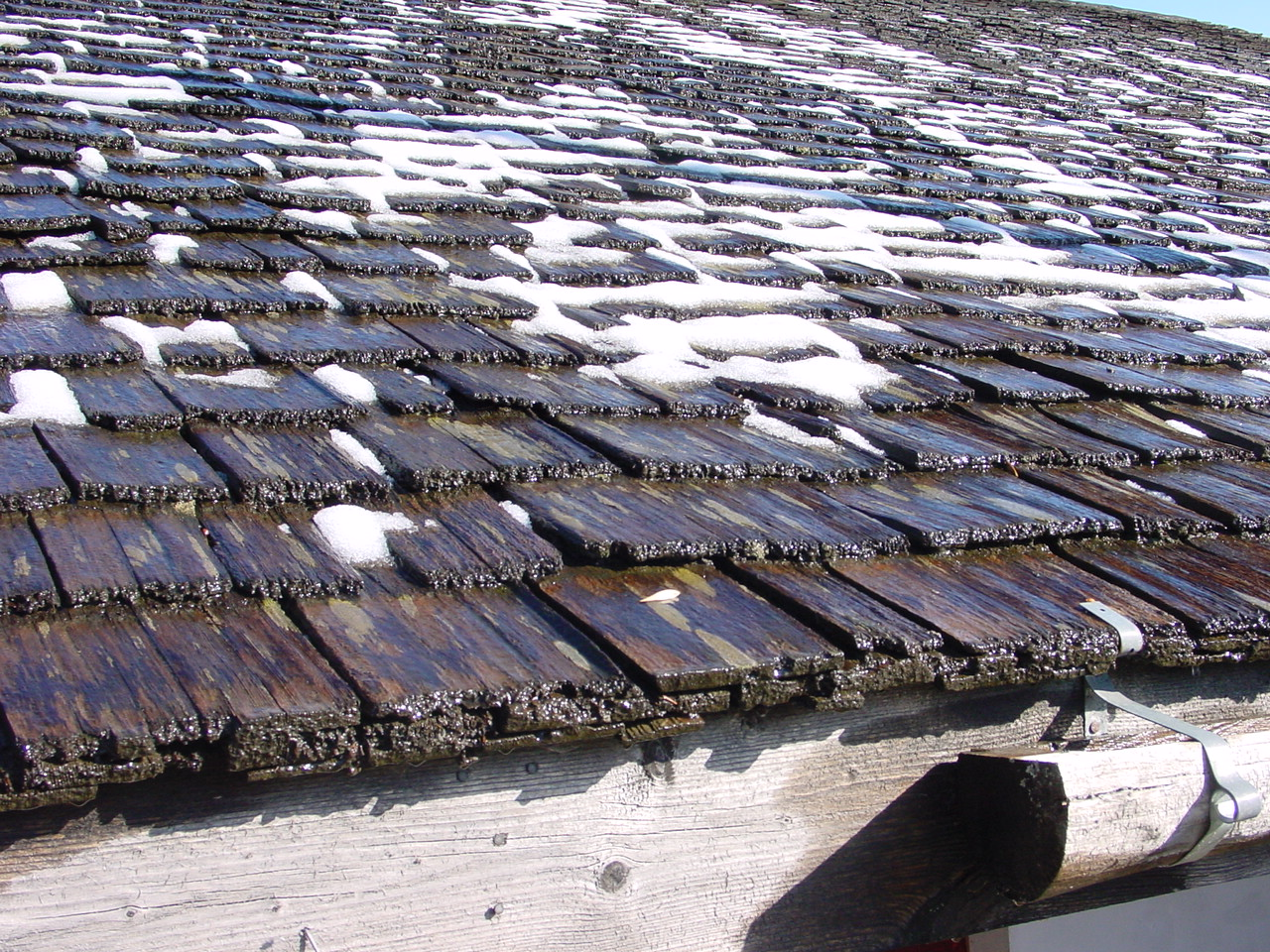
Tavaillon roof, Chablais.

They are mainly found in the Massif Central, Burgundy, Champagne, and Lorraine. They are also traditional in mountainous regions. Despite being prohibitively expensive, they are often replaced by more modern materials. However, there is still a resurgence, and the expertise of roofers persists. Unfortunately, the extraction of these products has ceased in many regions. A revival is taking place through local productions, imports from Aosta Valley in Italy for Alpine roofs, and the appearance in recent years of industrial products imitating lauzes. All these products, regardless of their size and origin, require reinforced frameworks and are generally installed using the double roofing technique.

==== Roofing with large elements ====
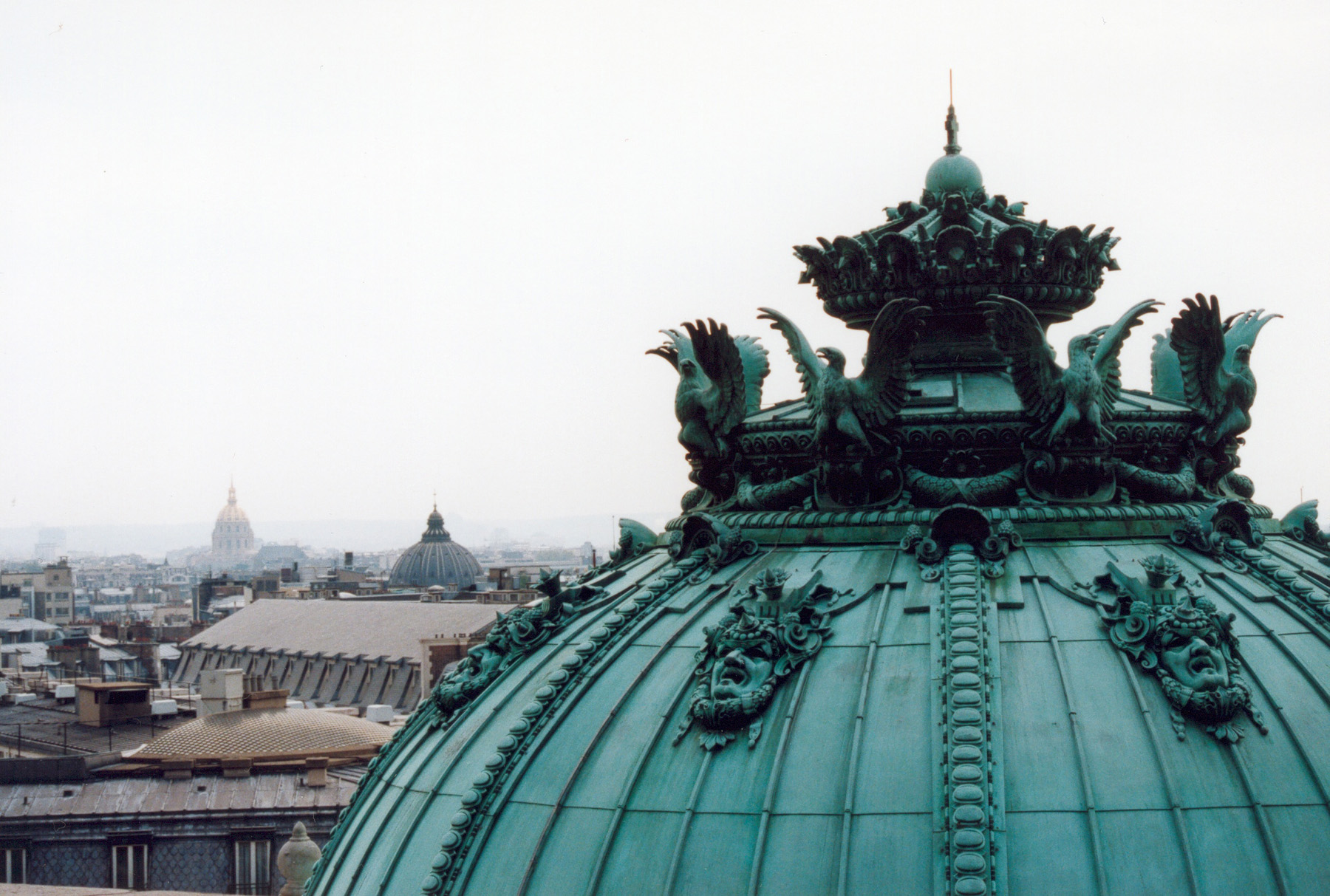
Roofs of the Palais Garnier.

Two types of materials are distinguished:

- Self-supporting steel trays (or aluminum, but less commonly used) installed directly on the framework.
- Sheet metals (zinc, copper), supported by continuous backing.

Sheet metal roofs have excellent durability over time and develop a patina that enhances their appearance. Copper turns black and then patinates or oxidizes into a green hue. Zinc, on the other hand, acquires a highly appreciated platinum ash color. Both zinc and copper are easy to shape, bend, and weld, making them suitable for even the most complex installations.

==== Installation of sheet metals ====
- Support:

The support consists of continuous boarding (with a spacing of 5 mm between boards) or continuous backing (plywood or chipboard) covered with a film with studs to allow air circulation between the support and the metal elements.

- Arrangement:

Custom-shaped elements are arranged parallel to the line of greatest slope and connected by stapling (butt joint system) or reliefs + cover joints (batten system). Junctions not parallel to the line of greatest slope are made differently depending on the slope of the slope. Junctions must ensure waterproofing, free expansion, and fixing of the elements. The width of the sheets is determined by the exposure to wind.

==== Steel trays ====
Also known as self-supporting covers (with no continuous support), they were originally reserved for industrial buildings but have found some applications in housing, especially in mountainous areas, due to their economic, frost-resistant, and reliable qualities. These products, made of galvanized, lacquered, and ribbed sheets, are also available in a wide range of colors. These covers are particularly used in countries prone to strong winds and tropical cyclones, such as the Caribbean and the Indian Ocean (Reunion, Mauritius, etc.). The significant ribbing of these elements eliminates the need for purlins, and fixing is done by screw and sealing washer at the upper part of the joint between two plates. Steel trays are commonly sold in lengths of up to 12 meters, adaptable upon request, and in widths ranging from 0.6 to 1.1 meters. The span of these products depends on the depth of the ribs, the thickness of the sheet, as well as the climatic constraints to be taken into account, ranging from 2 meters to 7 meters and more. To solve condensation problems due to differences in indoor and outdoor temperatures, as well as acoustic issues, double-skinned steel trays with internal insulation are offered.

==== Panels for roofing ====
The most well-known forms are corrugated sheets made of galvanized steel, fiberglass, or bituminous synthetic material. Very lightweight and inexpensive, these sheets are very easy to apply by simple screwing (with screws) or nailing onto rafters. Other, more recent sheets replicate one or several rows of tiles, with colors that resemble, depending on the regions, either tiles or slate. Quick to install, these sheets have the advantage of being very economical. These sheets are available in electro-galvanized steel, galvanized with painted coating, and also synthetic material, generally in more or less standard dimensions of 1 meter in width by 2 meters in length. These different molded sheets also exist in translucent materials of the same dimensions and can be interposed on an opaque roof without any problem.

==== Thatch ====
Still very present fifty years ago on rural buildings in several French regions, notably in Normandy and the Camargue, thatch had almost disappeared due to a lack of specialists. There are now a few dozen practitioners across the country who install this type of roofing, which is designed to last 30 to 50 years when properly implemented. Dried reeds are used, tightly bundled to prevent water from seeping through.

==== Green roofs ====
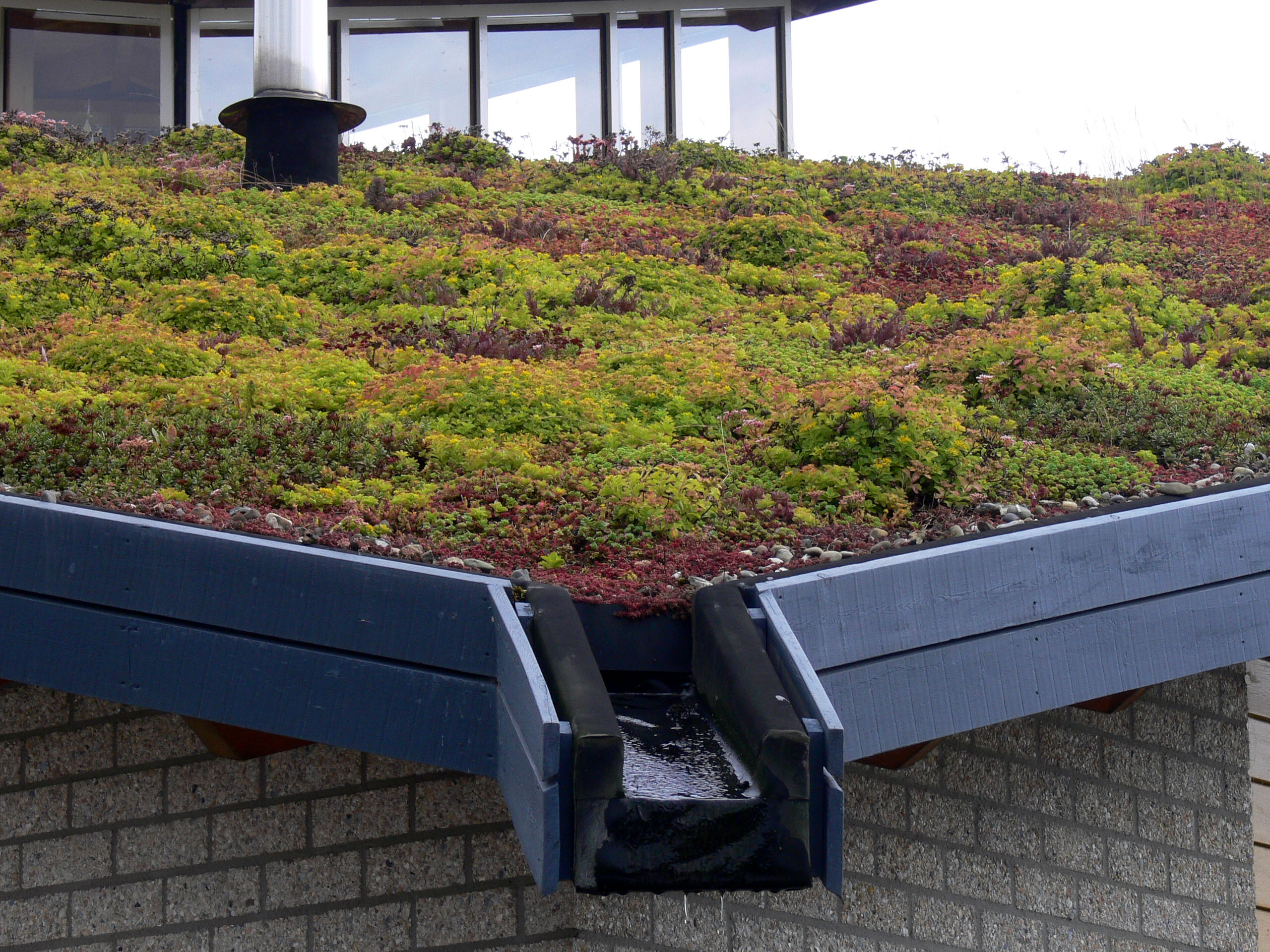
Sedum-based roof, eco-district of Eva Lanxmeer, Netherlands.

Existing for several thousand years and used by a few pioneers in the United States, these roofs, intended for low-slope roofs, have made a comeback in northern Europe since the 1970s and are beginning to be established in Latin countries. Particularly suitable for absorbing thermal shocks, they are favored for their aesthetics and ecological impacts: attenuation of urban heat peaks, buffer zones during rainfall, improved humidity in the home, and CO_{2} absorption. Their implementation has a low additional cost compared to more traditional roofs, and they offer the advantage of better waterproofing.

==== Transparent glass roofing ====
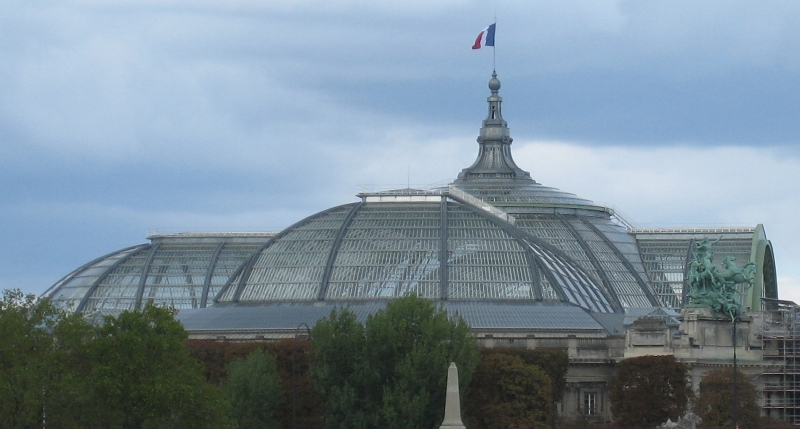
Glass roof of the Grand Palais (Paris).

Built to bring in light and warmth from the sun, these coverings, more commonly known as glass roofs, became very popular from the 15th century during the Italian Renaissance and then in Europe, to glaze the arcades of large royal estates' Orangeries and the pleasure greenhouses in the 19th century. It was also during this period that this type of roofing was used to protect railway station halls, large hotels, exhibition halls and museums, department stores, shopping arcade passages, and some grand palaces (Reichstag building, Grand Palais in Paris, etc.); all on superb metal architecture, all classified as Historical Monuments.

The material used initially was single-pane glass, known to the Romans but little used in civil architecture until the 15th century. The evolution of techniques towards "sandwich" glass composed of two glass sheets glued to a synthetic film improved mechanical resistance, safety, and allowed for larger glazed surfaces. The use of glass with a central metal framework (factory roof sheds), organic glass, resin as for polycarbonate sheets, widely used for veranda roofing due to their lightness, insulation power, and impact resistance. Modern techniques and the use of synthetic glass allow for the creation of tinted, opaque, curved, custom-sized glass, etc. Ventilation of premises can be ensured by installing translucent panels on roofs (Vasistas).

==== Rainwater receivers ====
Rainwater receivers come in two types: gutters (commercial profiles) and custom-made gutters manufactured according to an existing support.

They are characterized by their evacuation potential (flow rate in liters per second), which will depend on:

- Their slope (minimum 0.005 m/m);
- Their shape;
- Their cross-section in cm² (for low-slope gutters with variable development);
- The projected area of the slopes they serve.

The maximum allowable flow rate is 3 l/min/m² (projected surface area). They are connected to the sewage network by cylindrical downpipes for rainwater (E.P.) of various diameters or square/rectangular with different cross-sections (cm²). It is considered that 1 cm² of section evacuates 1 m² of ground surface in the case of a cylindrical connection to the receiver. In the case of a tapered connection (funnel), this value is reduced to 0.7 cm²/m². The capacity of structures collecting rainwater will be calculated based on the ground projection in m² of the slopes considered.

These structures are commonly referred to as "galvanizing" or "roofing" and fall under the responsibility of the roofer, plumber, or plumber-roofer.

== Construction technique ==
Two construction lines, however, are common to all installation techniques:

- The level line;
- The line of greatest slope (the path followed by water by gravity on a slope).

They are perpendicular. The elements of a roof will always be arranged according to these lines, which will also serve as the basis for all implementation drawings.

=== Edges ===
Edges are the lines that determine the geometric limits of a slope. They can be integrated into the slope (chimney passage, roof window, ventilation), at the junction of two slopes, or at the boundary of a building. They are classified and treated differently depending on their orientation relative to the line of greatest slope.

- Edges that water follows or straight edges parallel to the line of greatest slope.
- Edges that water escapes (ridge, hips) forming an acute angle with the level line.
- Edges that receive water (gutters, valleys, beveled edges) forming an obtuse angle with the level line.

=== Inherent problems with waterproofing, durability, and resistance of roofing ===
One of the major problems to be solved in establishing installation rules is capillarity (water rising) between elements. It is decisive in the choice of joint type or the value of overlap. Phenomena due to wind action, overpressure, and depression, static loads (snow, ice) influence supports and fixings. Condensation, electrochemical incompatibility between metals or between metals and materials (specific wood species or concrete) compromise the durability of structures.

== Roofer ==
One of the major challenges in the roofing profession lies in how to carry out these works depending on whether they are located at the junction of slopes or not.

The work of the roofer therefore consists of:

- Choosing a material
- Choosing an installation technique
- Marking the location of each element
- Shaping the materials
- Installing them while respecting waterproofing, fixing, and possibly expansion rules.

=== Criteria for choosing ===
The choice of material is made based on multiple criteria. In most cases, local authorities impose types of roofs based on architectural or environmental constraints.

The choice of material and/or the implementation of an installation technique will depend on:

- The slope of the slope in % or °
- The ground projection of the slope considered in meters
- Its geographical location (climate zone defined by maps taking into account the combination of rain/wind or mountainous area, etc.)
- Its local geographical location (climatic site)
- Snow and wind mechanical constraints (rules and NV 65 map)
- Local environmental constraints (aesthetic, architectural, etc.)

==== Three climatic zones ====
- Zone I consists of the entire interior of the country, the Mediterranean coast, and altitudes below 200 m.
- Zone II includes the Atlantic coast within 20 km deep and altitudes between 200 and 500 m.
- Zone III includes the Atlantic, Channel, and North Sea coasts within 20 km deep and altitudes above 500 m.

==== Three situations ====
The building's location relative to the environment overlaps with the climatic zone.

- A sheltered site corresponds to a construction in the hollow of a basin surrounded by hills on all sides and thus protected from the wind.
- A normal site is a plain or plateau with little variation in elevation.
- An exposed site is where the buildings are located on the coast up to about 5 km deep, on the tops of cliffs, in estuaries or enclosed bays, and, inland, in narrow windy valleys, on isolated or high mountains.

=== Roofing at high altitudes ===
Mountain buildings (above 900 m) require a "double roof" composed of several layers. The large temperature differences between outside/inside and night/day cause phenomena such as dew point (Condensation) and freeze/thaw harmful to building preservation.

- Interior condensation, often invisible, damages coatings and causes mold. It results from the low temperature inside the walls combined with a high humidity level.
- Freeze/thaw causes the formation of extremely heavy icicles at the edge of the slopes, dangerous for pedestrians and destructive for materials. The phenomenon is simple: heated from below, the snow melts, flows between the slope and the snow cover, then freezes passing over the overhangs of the roof exposed to the cold air. Tons of ice can accumulate.

The "double roof" is the most effective way to counteract these drawbacks. The complex consists of:

- A vapor barrier is placed at the ceiling of the rooms in the sloping ceiling. Acting as a barrier to vapor, it prevents it from entering the insulation and condensing inside it.
- Above, the thermal insulation prevents the temperature of the wall from dropping, reducing the risk of interior condensation.
- The insulation is then coated with waterproofing to protect it from condensate from the roof. – An air gap circulates between the waterproofing and the roof elements. It must be at the outside temperature to prevent thaw/refreeze. In some cases, linear ventilation "ridge gutter" will be implemented. – Finally, the actual roofing is carried out.

In order:

1. Rafters
2. Thin insulation
3. Counter batten
4. 27 mm deck board
5. Cabrons
6. Tar insulation
7. Pressure-treated counter batten
8. 4*10 pressure-treated basting
9. Non-felted corrugated steel fixed in corrugated steel + "snow stops"

== Rules and techniques of implementation ==
The design and implementation of roofs are subject to the rules of the trade, standards, and technical opinions of official bodies as well as the installation advice from manufacturers.

=== In france ===
The design and implementation of roofs are subject to DTU (Document Technique Unifié) regulations in the 40 series. In the absence of official standards, Technical Assessments (ATec) are taken into account.

- DTU 40.11 Slate Roofing
- DTU 40.13 Fiber Cement Slate Roofing
- DTU 40.21 Interlocking or Sliding Clay Tile Roofs with Relief
- DTU 40.211 Clay Tile Roofs with Flat Gauge
- DTU 40.22 Canal Clay Tile Roofing
- DTU 40.23 Flat Clay Tile Roofs
- DTU 40.24 Concrete Tile Roofing with Sliding and Longitudinal Interlocking
- DTU 40.241 Concrete Flat Tile Roofing with Sliding and Longitudinal Interlocking
- DTU 40.25 Concrete Flat Tile Roofing
- DTU 40.35 Ribbed Sheet Roofing from Coated Steel Sheets
- DTU 40.36 Pre-painted or Non-pre-painted Aluminum Sheet Roofing
- DTU 40.41 Roofing with Metal Elements in Zinc Sheets and Long Sheets
- DTU 40.44 Roofing with Metal Elements in Stainless Steel Sheets and Long Sheets
- DTU 40.45 Roofing with Metal Elements in Copper Sheets and Long Sheets
- DTU 40.46 Lead Roofing on Continuous Support
- DTU 40.5 Rainwater Disposal Works

== Roofer's vocabulary ==
In addition to the technical terms used by roofers, there are names for tiles used for finishing, decoration, and waterproofing of roofs. Here are the main terms to better understand the language of architects, builders, or roofers.

- Hip: protruding line formed by the intersection of two roof slopes.
- Brisé: the lower part of a Mansard roof.
- Cabrons: over-rafter wooden profiles that create waves under flexible covering.
- Chanlatte: beveled wooden lath, nailed on the rafters at the edge of the roof to compensate for the missing tile thickness in the first row (tilting). It can be replaced by a double batten.
- Pet door: Metal or clay elements designed for roof and attic ventilation.
- Coffin: (or cofine) tile or slate curved in the width direction.
- Double tile: double row of tiles or slate, laid on the chanlatte, which makes up the roof edge. Also called a battlement.
- Eaves: lower edge of a slope often equipped with a gutter.
- Ridge tile: half-round or angular tile that covers the horizontal beam, called "ridge," placed at the junction of two slopes of a roof.
- Standing seam: roofing and facade covering technique using waterproof metal.
- Gambrel tile: tile curved inward in the width direction.
- Left-handed tile: tile curved in length on its left edge, called "left to left," or right, called "left to right."
- Giron tile: trapezoidal tile for making turrets, towers, or domes.
- Lantern: ventilation cap that finishes an air intake, a vent, etc.
- Batten: wooden strip nailed to the rafters that receives the tile hooks, commonly called a "roof batten."
- Valley: inward ridge between two roof slopes.
- Hanging tile: tile curved in the length direction.
- Finial: decorative clay element that crowns the point of intersection of a ridge and hips, hips with each other if there is no ridge, or the top of a conical roof.
- Gauge: visible part of the tile or slate that is completely wetted by rainwater. It corresponds to the spacing of the battens.
- Bargeboard: the end of the roof on the gable side.

== See also ==
- Timber roof truss
- Eavesdrip
- Roofer
- Glossary of architecture
- Rain gutter
