= Wind brace =

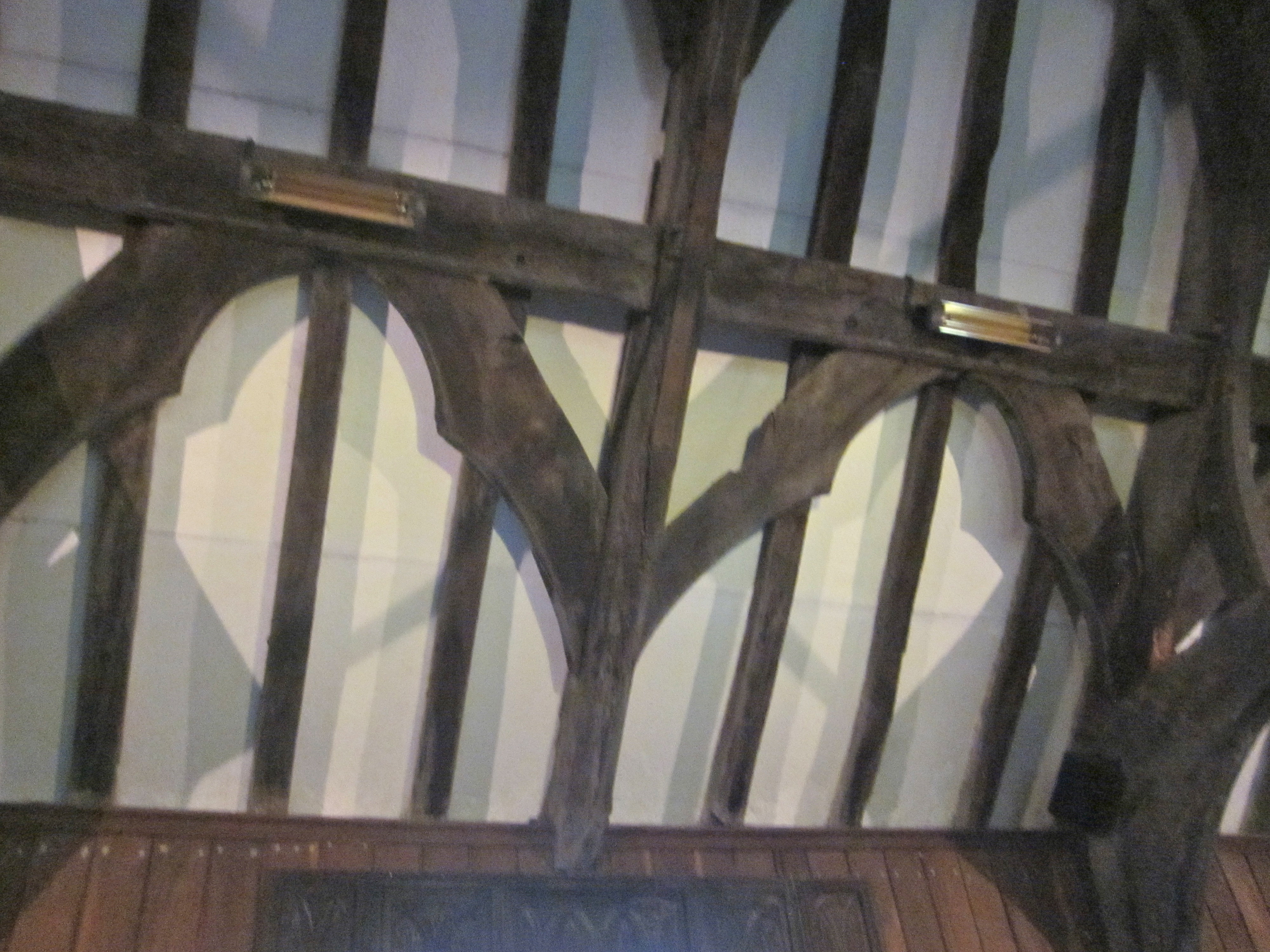
Trelystan Church, Montgomeryshire. Decorative arched wind braces between purlins- 15th-16th century

In architecture, wind braces are diagonal braces to tie the rafters of a roof together and prevent racking. In medieval roofs they are arched, and run from the principal rafters to catch the purlins.

== See also ==
- Cross bracing, reinforcement of structures using two diagonal supports which intersect
