= Rafter =

Supporting structural member in roof construction

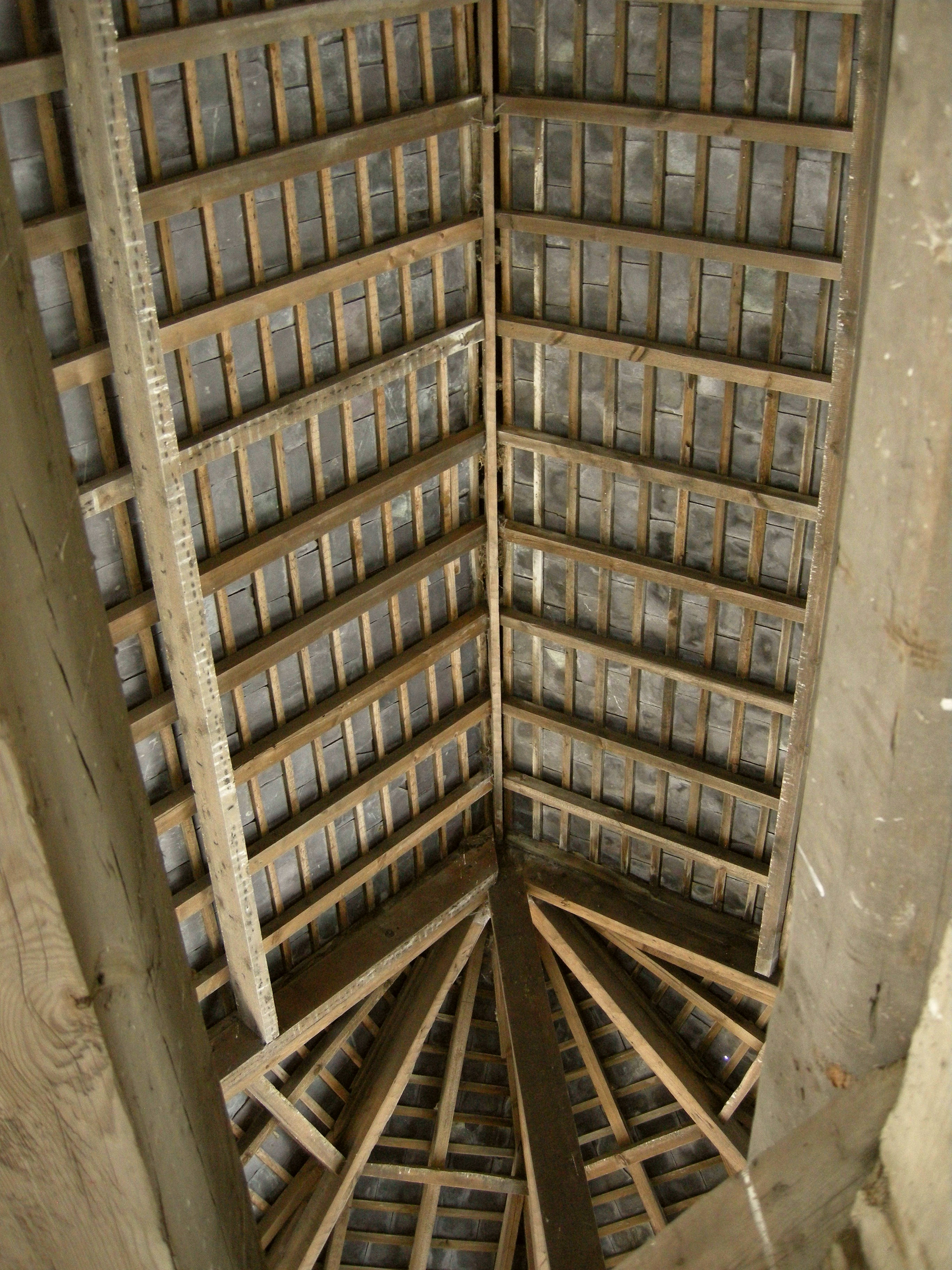
Common rafters without collar beams form most of this roof. There is not always a ridge board or beam where the rafter tops meet. Under the midsections of the rafters are purlins which support the common rafters and are supported by principal rafters. This roof ends in an octagonal hip.

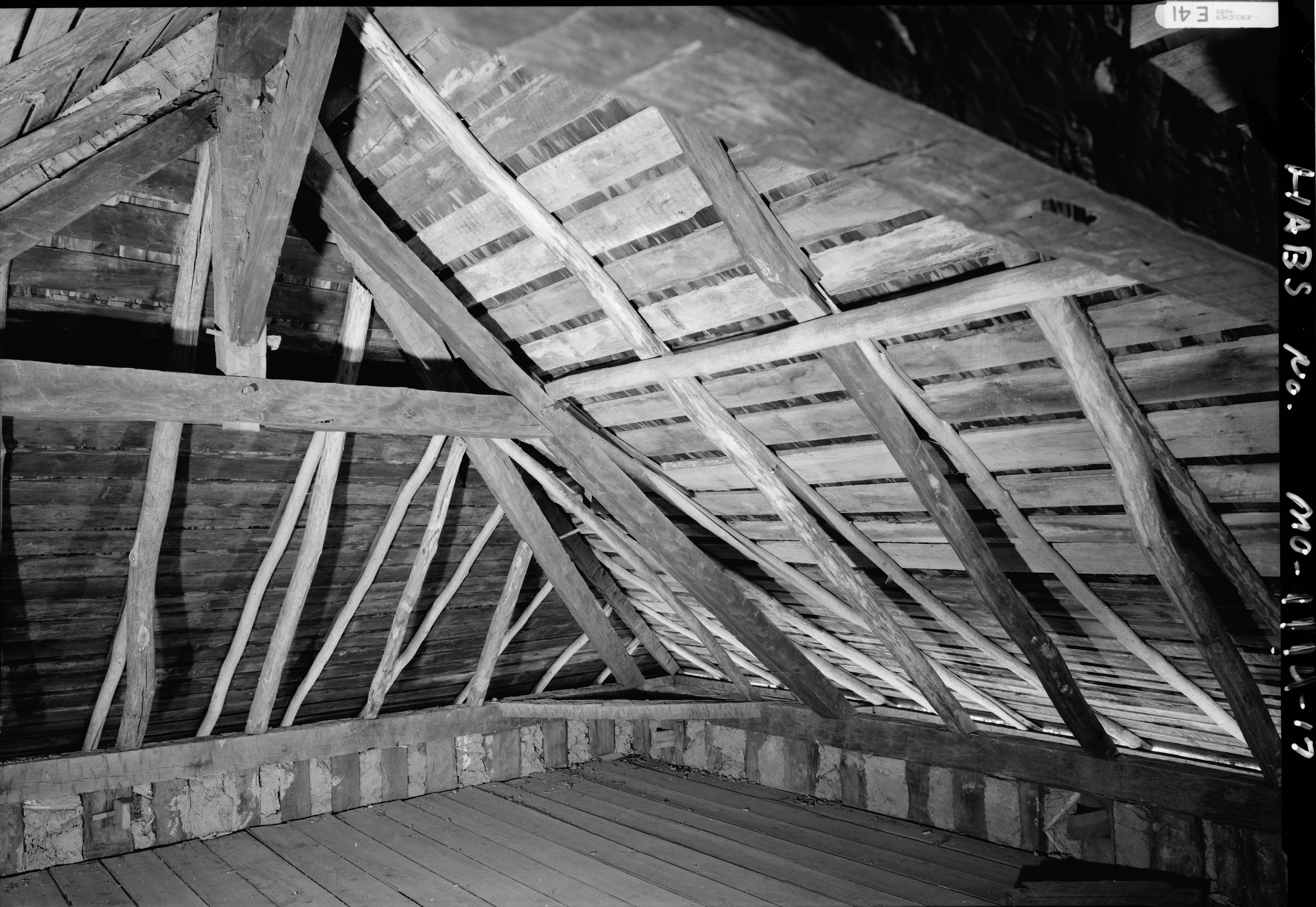
A double roof (using a Norman truss), common rafters supported by principal rafters (top chords in this case) and an unusual extra layer of common rafters on the lower half to form a gallerie. Note how the rafter poles for the gallerie tie-in. The Bequet-Ribault House was built c. 1793 near Ste. Geneviève, Missouri. It is one of five poteaux-en-terre buildings that survive in the US.

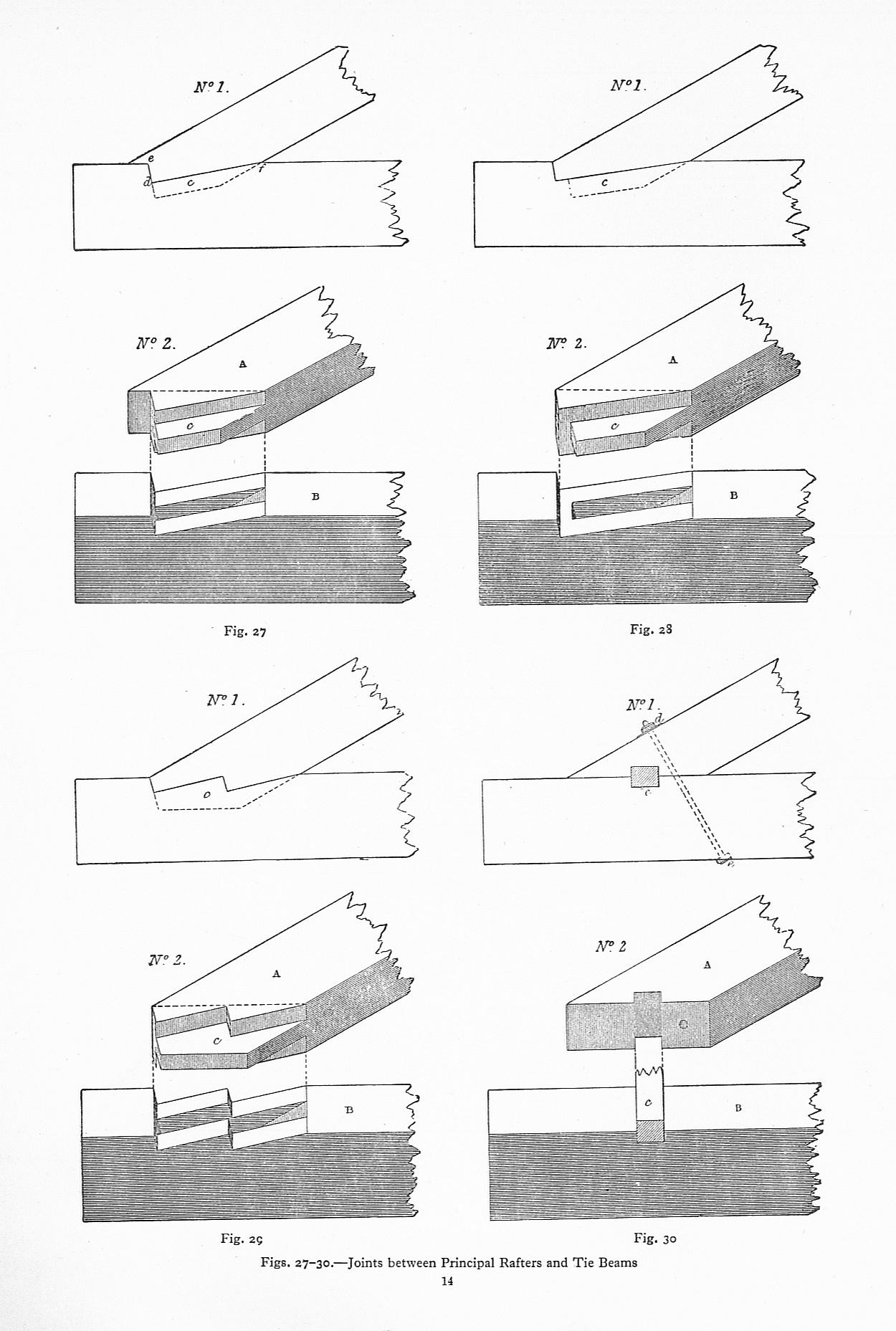
Rafter and tie-beam joints (Carpentry and Joinery, 1925)

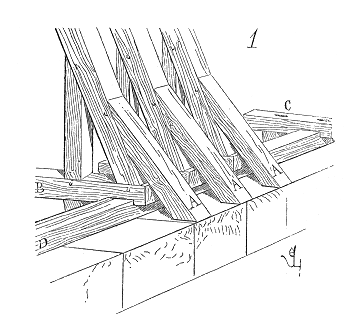
Coyau or sprocket. Labeled A

A rafter is one of a series of sloped structural members such as steel beams that extend from the ridge or hip to the wall plate, downslope perimeter or eave, and that are designed to support the roof shingles, roof deck, roof covering and its associated loads. A pair of rafters is called a couple. In home construction, rafters are normally made of wood. Exposed rafters are a feature of some traditional roof styles.

== Applications ==
In recent buildings there is a preference for trussed rafters on the grounds of cost, economy of materials, off-site manufacture, and ease of construction, as well as design considerations including span limitations and roof loads (weight from above).

== Types in traditional timber framing ==
There are many names for rafters depending on their location, shape, or size (see below).

The earliest surviving roofs in Europe are of common rafters on a tie beam; this assembly is known as a "closed couple". Later, principal rafters and common rafters were mixed, which is called a major/minor or primary/secondary roof system.

Historically many rafters, including hip rafters, often tapered in height 1/5 to 1/6 of their width, with the larger end at the foot. Architect George Woodward discusses the purpose of this in 1860: "The same amount of strength can be had with a less amount of lumber. There is an additional labor in sawing such rafters, as well as a different calculation to be made in using up a log to the best advantage. It is necessary always to order this special bill of rafters direct from the mill, and the result will be that the extra cost will, nine times out of ten, overbalance the amount saved." John Muller also discussed a one-sixth taper for rafters.

A piece added at the foot to create an overhang or change the roof pitch is called a sprocket, or coyau in French. The projecting piece on the gable of a building forming an overhang is called a lookout.

A rafter can be reinforced with a strut, principal purlin, collar beam, or, rarely, an auxiliary rafter (see below).

Rafter types include:

- Principal rafter (major rafter, rarely a chief rafter): A larger rafter. Usually land directly on a tie beam. Usually the purpose of having a larger rafter is to carry a purlin which supports the rafters in each bay. Sometimes the top cord (uppermost member) of a truss looks like a principal rafter. Principal rafters are sometimes simply called "principals".
- Common rafter (minor rafter): being smaller than a principal rafter. A "principal/common rafter roof" or "double roof" has both principals and commons. (Also called major/minor, primary/secondary).
- Auxiliary (cushon, compound, secondary, sub-) rafter: A secondary rafter below and supporting a principal rafter. A rare type of rafter.
- Compass rafter: A rafter curved or bowed on the top (the top surface of a rafter is called its "back") or both the top and bottom surfaces.
- Curb rafter: The upper rafters in a curb (kerb, gambrel, Mansard roof) roof.
- Hip rafter (angle rafter): The rafter in the corners of a hip roof. The foot of a hip rafter lands on a dragon beam.
- King rafter: the longest rafter on the side of a hip roof in line with the ridge.
- Valley rafter (historically also called a sleeper): A rafter forming a valley (look for illustration showing a valley).
- Intermediate rafter: "one between principal or common rafters to strengthen a given place" (rare).
- Jack rafter, cripple rafter, cripple-jack rafter: A shortened rafter such as landing on a hip rafter or interrupted by a dormer.
- Arched rafter: Of segmental form in an arched roof.
- Knee (crook, kneeling, cranked) rafter: A rafter with a bend typically a few feet from the foot used to gain attic space like adding a kneewall. Rare in America.
- Barge rafter: The outermost rafter on a gable end, sometimes forming a roof overhang.
- Butt rafter: A smaller rafter interrupted by and joined to a butt purlin. Common rafters pass over and are supported by a principal purlin, if present.
- A "binding rafter" is not a rafter but an obsolete name for a purlin or support.
- Part of a cruck frame may function as a rafter but they are called a cruck blade.

Rafters are usually made of pine or cedar. For longer span rafters, building materials manufacturers have created laminated veneer lumber (LVL) rafters that can be 2–5 times longer than typical wood rafters. In the US, most wood rafters have maximum length of 20 feet (6.1 m). If a longer rafter is needed, LVL is an alternative.

== See also ==
- Birdsmouth joint
- Chantlate
- Fascia (architecture)
- Joist
- Knee wall
- Lookout (architecture)
- Purlin
- Rafter angle square
- Soffit
- Truss
- Timber framing
- Timber roof truss
- Wind brace
