= Stillicidium =

Stillicidium, a dripping of water from the eaves (stilla, drop, cadere, to fall), is the term in architecture given by Vitruvius (v. 7) to the dripping eaves of the roof of the Etruscan temple.

Similar dripping eaves existed in most of the Greek Doric temples in contradistinction to the Ionic temples, where the water of the roof was collected in the cymatium or gutter and thrown out through the mouths of lions, whose heads were carved on the cymatium.
