= Soffit =

Exterior architectural feature

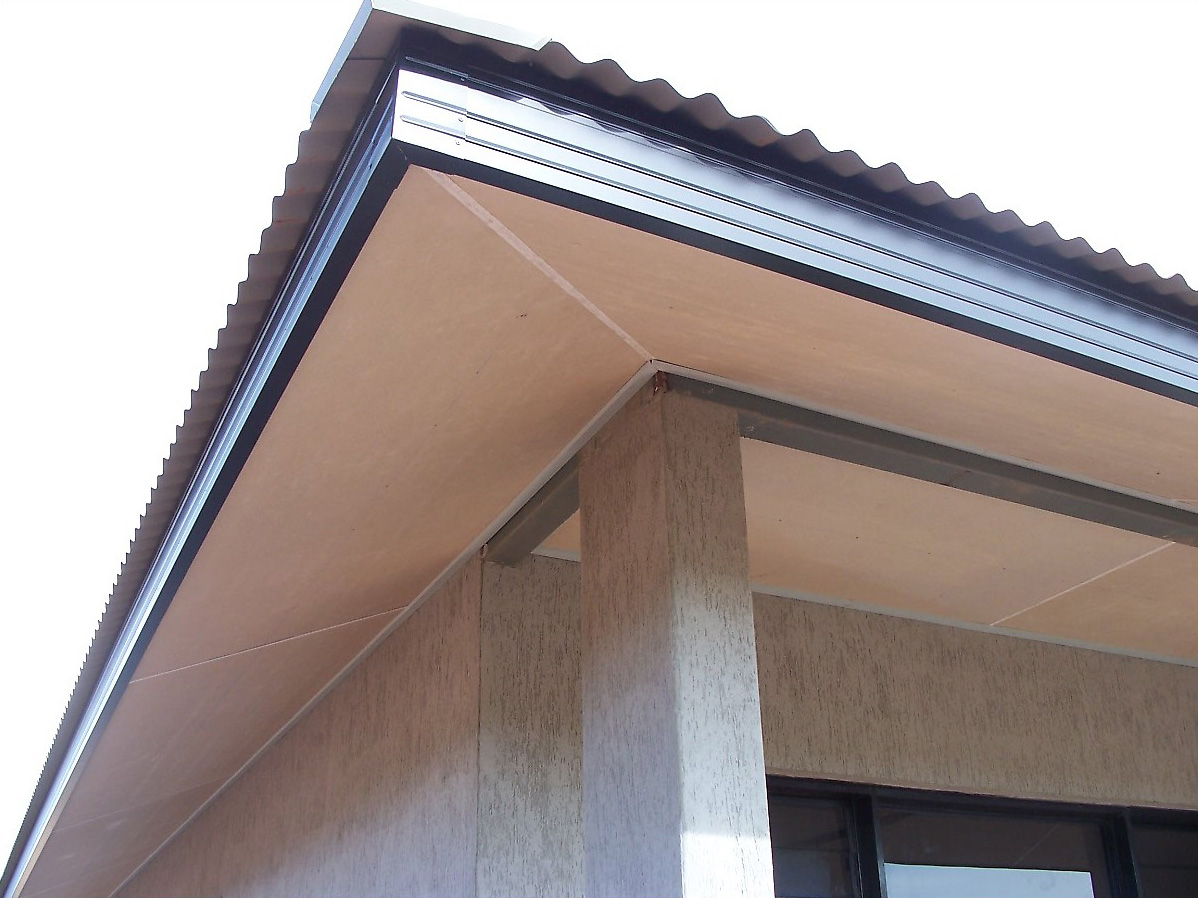
Eaves of a house in Northern Australia. The white underside would be referred to as a soffit. In this example the soffit is fixed to the slope of the rafters. The dark grey fascia boards form the outer edge and have a groove to receive the soffit lining sheets which cover the rafter tails.

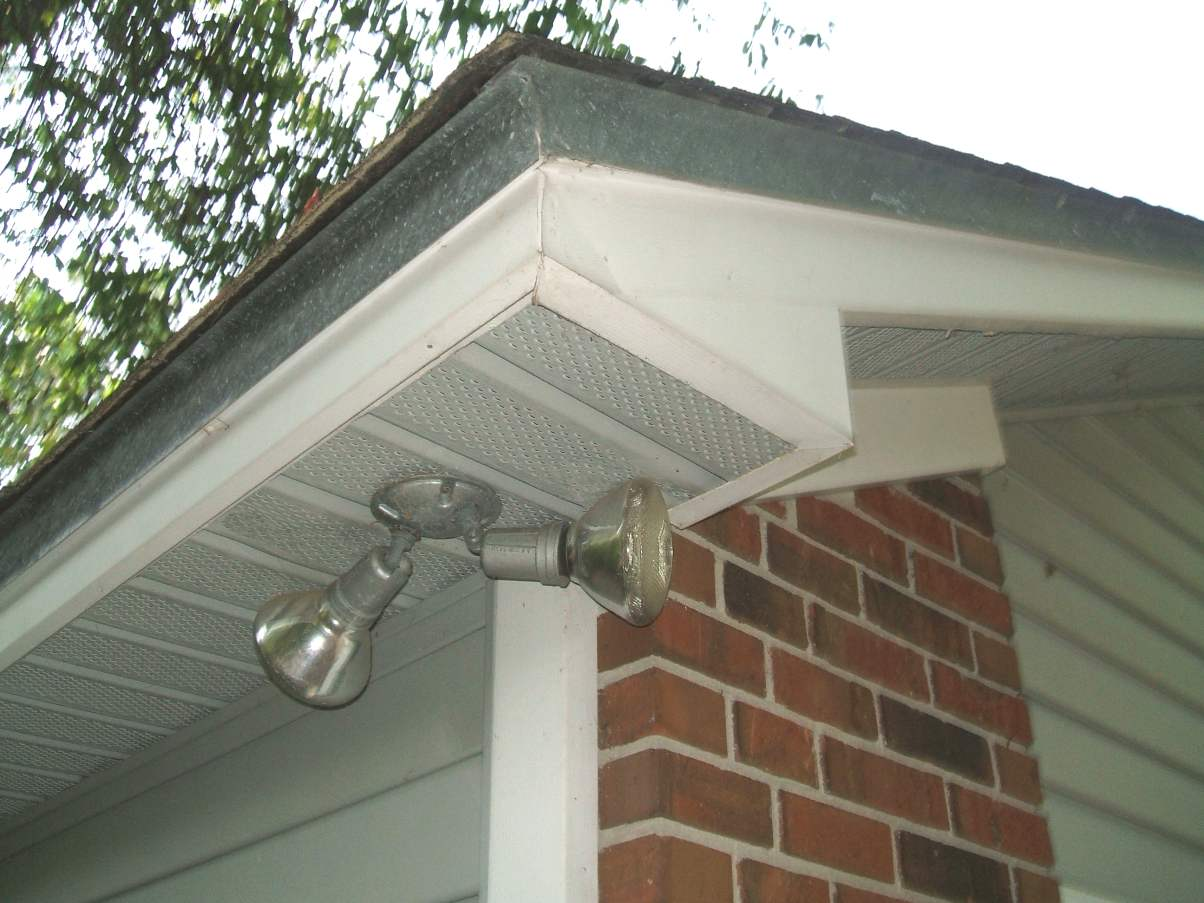
Boxed in soffit on a house in Northern Florida, United States. In this example the soffit material is 12 inches wide and made from center lanced U groove perforated sections of vinyl in a return fashion and fixed to the bottom chord of a truss roofing system extending beyond the exterior wall.

A soffit is an exterior architectural feature, generally the horizontal, aloft underside of the roof edge. Its archetypal form, sometimes incorporating or implying the projection of rafters or trusses over the exterior of supporting walls, is the underside of eaves (to connect a supporting wall to projecting edge(s) of the roof). The vertical band at the edge of the roof is called a fascia. A soffit of an arch is frequently called an intrados.

== Etymology ==
The term soffit is from Italian: soffitto, formed as a ceiling; and directly from suffictus for suffixus, Latin: suffigere, to fix underneath), first recorded in English in the 1610s.

== Soffits in homes and offices ==
In architecture, soffit is the underside (but not base) of any construction element.

Examples include:

Description	More precise synonym
undersurface or under-face of any overhanging section of a roof eave	
underside of a cornice	
underside of a flight of stairs, under the classical entablature	
framework-filled area beneath kink of a chimney	undercroft of chimney
wall into which loudspeakers are mounted in a recording studio	wall with speaker recesses
curvature of e.g. plasterwork to fill the space above the kitchen cabinets, at the corner of the ceiling and wall	coving (interior design)
underside of office ceiling of tiles (often gypsum) suspended, fastened or bonded to a grid system attached to the walls and/or ceiling	false/suspended ceiling (tiles/grid) or dropped ceiling
underside of an arch or architrave (whether supported by piers or columns)	underarches
lower (usually false) ceiling area to mask and allow egress of upper end of ventilation hood(s)/flues	false ceiling/lower ceiling beneath (multi-light/surround) lantern/raised skylight/dome/sloped upper ceiling

== Under the eaves of a roof ==
In foremost use soffit is the first definition in the table above. In spatial analysis, it is one of the two necessary planes of any (3-dimensional) optionally built area, eaves, which projects, for such area to be within the building's space.

In two-dimensional face analysis it is a disсrete face almost always parallel with the ground that bridges the gap(s) between a building's siding (walls) and either: their parallel extraneous plane (fascia) where such exists; or where no such plane, a point along (or the abrupt end of) the roof's outer projection (overhang). Soffits and fascias are archetypally screwed or nailed to rafters known as lookout rafters or lookouts for short, their repair being often undertaken simultaneously. A parapet wall or cornice tend to preclude eaves, as an alternate design, both favouring flat roofs and weather-proof walls. Very pronounced overhangs (eaves) are characteristic to European architecture to shield the walls from rain, sleet and snow such as Swiss chalet style, Dutch, Romanian, and Tudor architecture.

Soffit exposure profile (from wall to fascia) on a building's exterior can vary from a few centimetres (2–3 inches) to 3 feet or more, depending on construction. It can be non-ventilated or ventilated, to prevent condensation. A grill that covers the venting opening on the bottom of the soffit is called a soffit vent. A soffit joist can be added to the framework instead of or in addition to lookouts.
