= Eavesdrip =

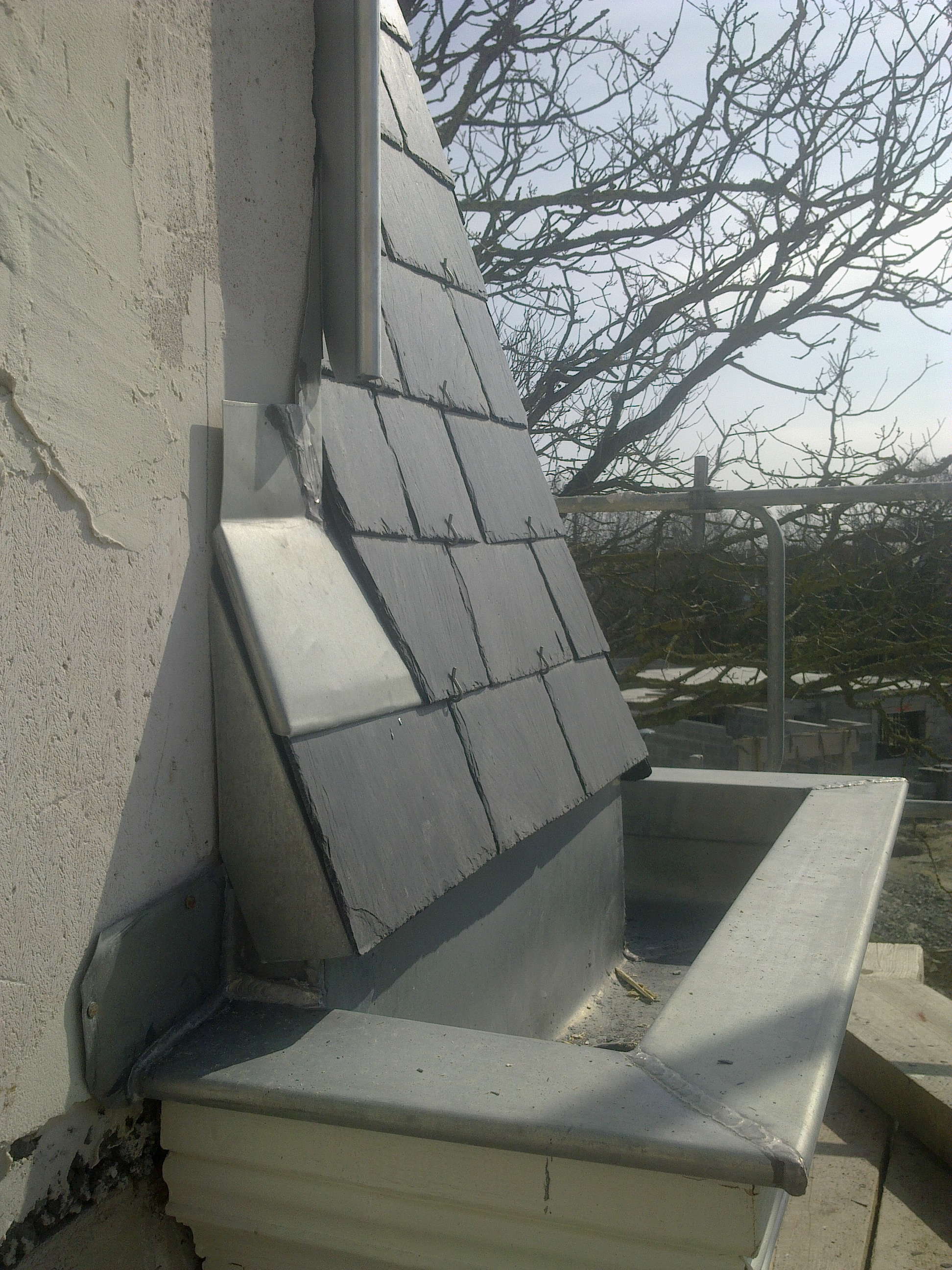
An eavesdrip envlosed by zinc cladding

The eavesdrop, eavesdrip, or dripline, is the width of ground around a house or building which receives the rain water dropping from the eaves. By an ancient Anglo-Saxon law, a landowner was forbidden to erect any building at less than two feet from the boundary of his land, and was thus prevented from injuring his neighbour's house or property by the dripping of water from his eaves. The law of Eavesdrip had its equivalent in the Roman stillicidium, which prohibited building up to the very edge of an estate.

== See also ==
- Eaves-drip burial
