= Jenny Baglivo =

American mathematician, statistician, and author

- Born: 1948 (age 77–78); Brooklyn, New York, U.S.
- Education: Fordham University; Syracuse University (PhD)
- Scientific career
- Workplaces: Fairfield University; Memorial Sloan Kettering Cancer Center; Boston College
- Thesis: Equivariant Wall Obstruction Theory (1976)
- Doctoral advisor: Douglas R. Anderson

Jenny Antoinette Baglivo (born 1948) is an American mathematician, statistician, and book author. She is retired as a professor of mathematics at Boston College, where she retains an affiliation as research professor.

== Education and career ==
Baglivo is originally from Brooklyn, the daughter of a watch repairer and granddaughter of Italian immigrants. The only one of four siblings to attend college, she majored in mathematics at Fordham University, graduating in 1970. She went to Syracuse University for graduate study, earning a master's degree in mathematics in 1972, a second master's degree in computer and information science in 1976, and a Ph.D. in mathematics in 1976, specializing in algebraic topology. Her dissertation, Equivariant Wall Obstruction Theory, concerned Wall's finiteness obstruction, and was supervised by Douglas R. Anderson.

After completing her doctorate, she became an assistant professor of mathematics at Fairfield University, and was promoted to associate professor in 1981. While continuing to hold an affiliation at Fairfield, she also became a postdoctoral researcher at the Memorial Sloan Kettering Cancer Center from 1980 to 1982. There, she worked as a biostatistician on CT scans of brains. She moved from Fairfield to Boston College in 1986, and was promoted to full professor in 1992.

== Books ==
Baglivo's book Incidence and Symmetry in Design and Architecture (Cambridge University Press, 1983, with Jack E. Graver) won an Alpha Sigma Nu Book Award in 1983, and has been recommended for undergraduate mathematics libraries by the Basic Library List Committee of the Mathematical Association of America.

She is also the author of Mathematica Laboratories for Mathematical Statistics: Emphasizing Simulation and Computer Intensive Methods (SIAM, 2005).
