= Cross bracing =

X-shaped support substructure

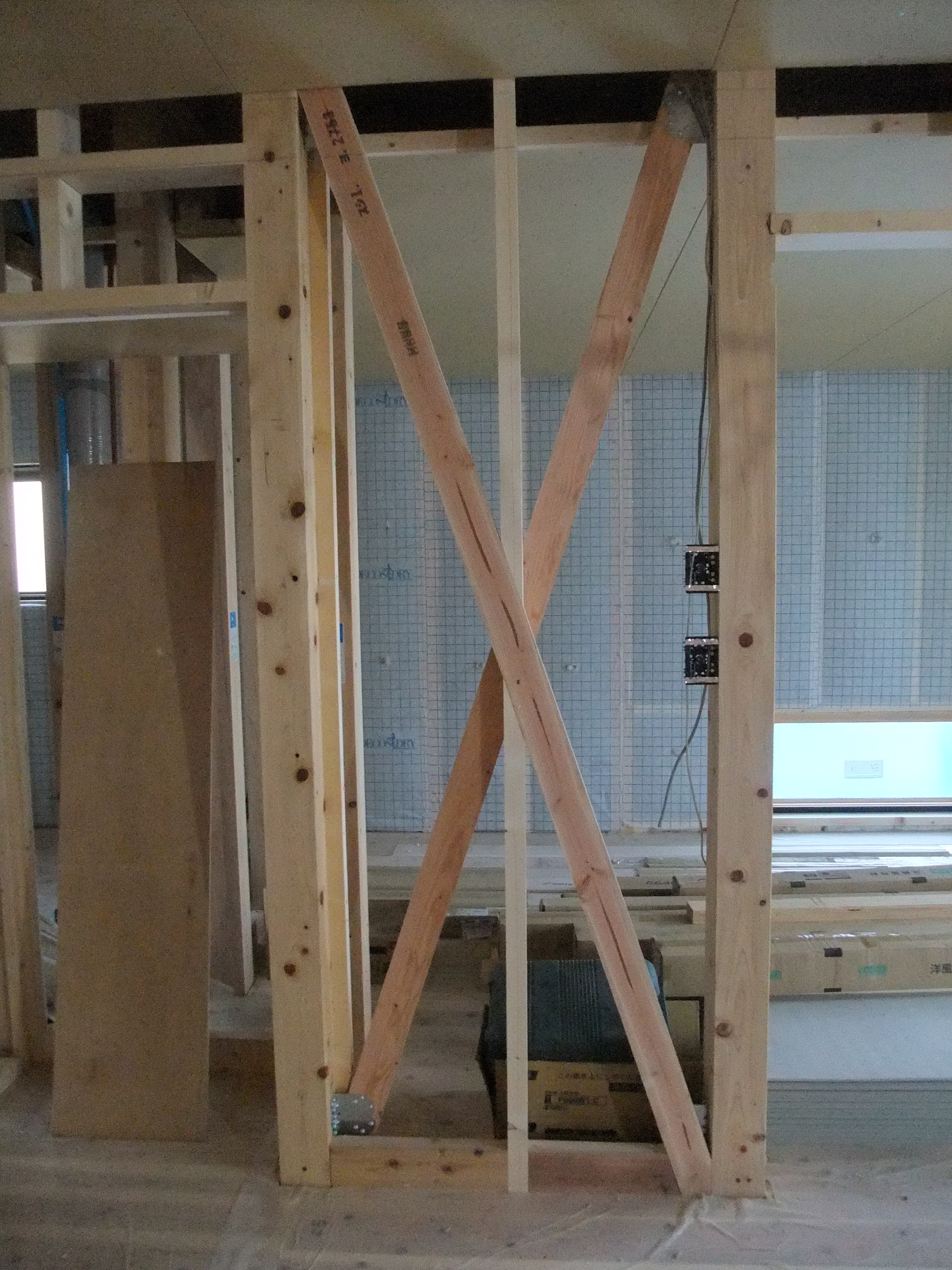
Cross bracing between studs in a Japanese house

In construction, cross bracing, also known as herringbone strutting, blocking, bridging, and dwanging, are diagonal supports that intersect to reinforce structures.

Cross bracing is usually seen with two diagonal supports placed in an X-shaped manner. Under lateral force (such as wind or seismic activity) one brace will be under tension while the other is being compressed. In steel construction, steel cables may be used due to their great resistance to tension (although they cannot take any load in compression). The common uses for cross bracing include bridge (side) supports, along with structural foundations. This method of construction maximizes the weight of the load a structure is able to support. It is a usual application when constructing earthquake-safe buildings.

Cross bracing can be applied to any rectangular frame structure, such as chairs and bookshelves. Its rigidity for two-dimensional grid structures can be analyzed mathematically as an instance of the grid bracing problem.

Cross bracing may employ full diagonals, or corner bracing or knee bracing.

The idea of cross bracing is also applied to sport ram-air parachutes to improve their structural integrity.

== Mining tunnels ==
To add rigidity to the construction of mining tunnels, the cross-beam connecting between arches is also a type of cross brace. They are often tubular and modified on the ends with clips or apertures for screw fastening. They serve as a stiffening element for the stability of a design. This brace could also be an ordinary cross-section wooden cross-beam, or even a board.

Cross bracing can be seen in situations like flooring, where cross braces are put between floor joists in order to prevent movement. It is also commonly used for ship making in order to stand against heavy winds or extreme weather.

== Gallery ==
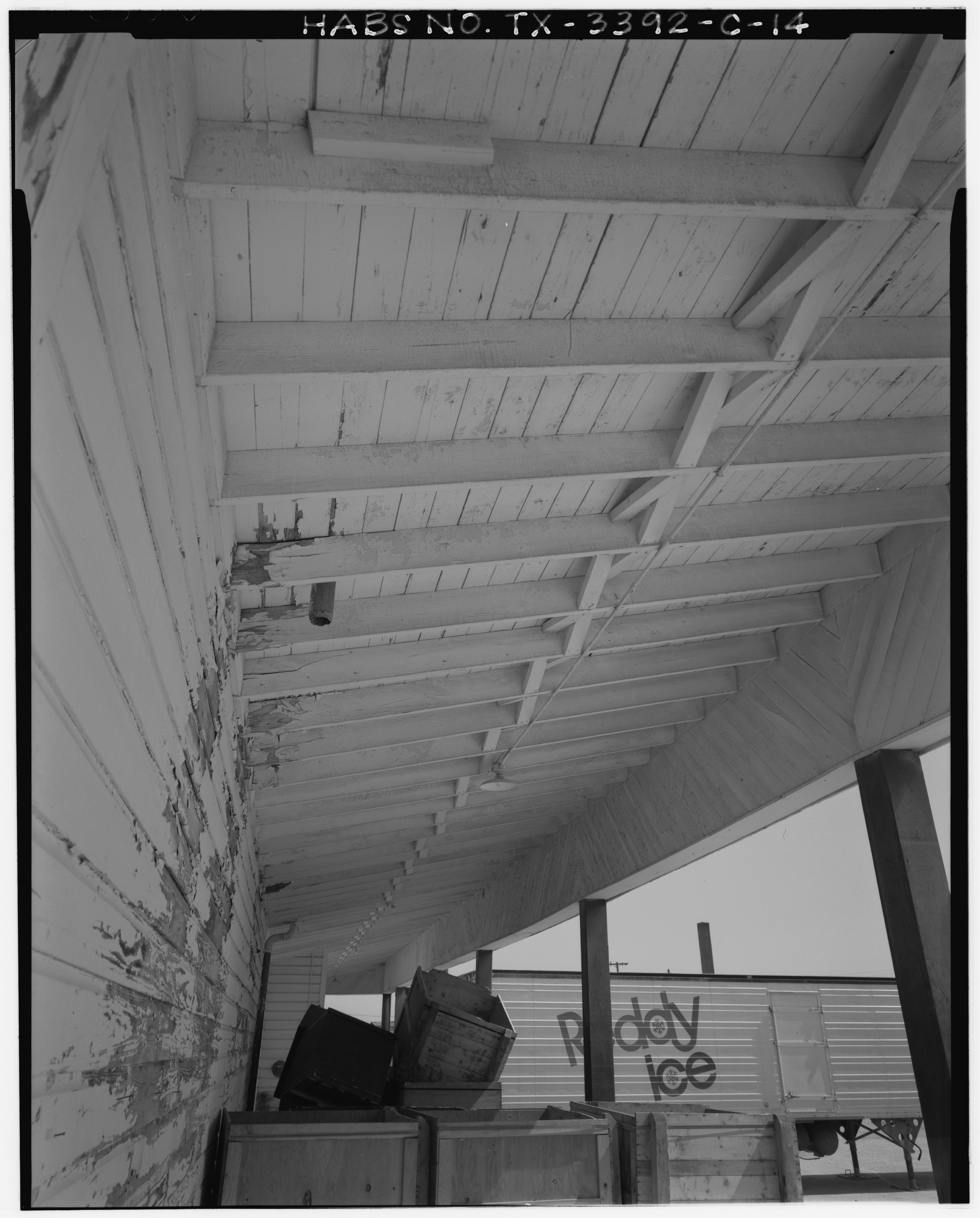
Cross bracing between joists or rafters strengthens the members by preventing sideways deflection.

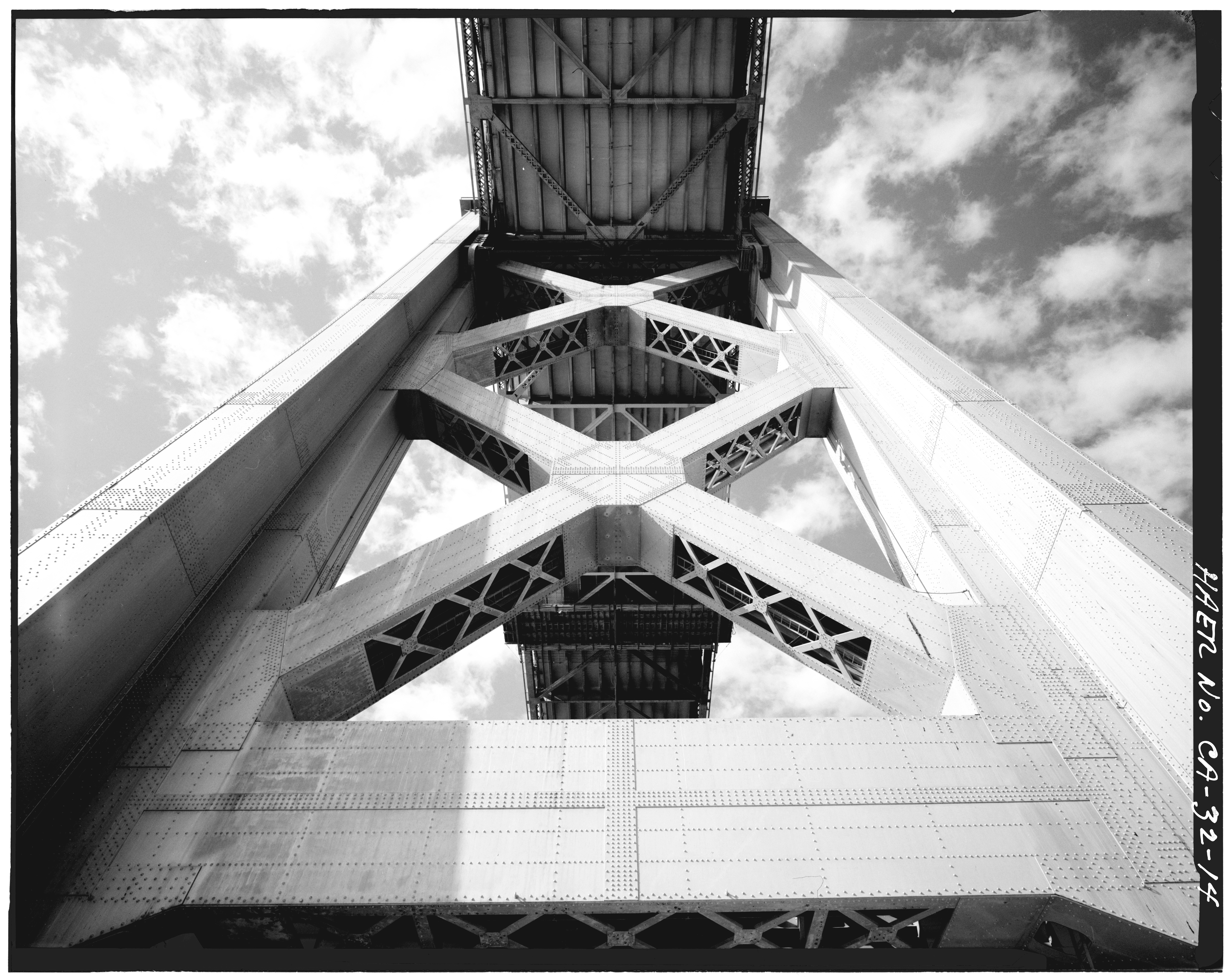
Cross bracing on a bridge tower

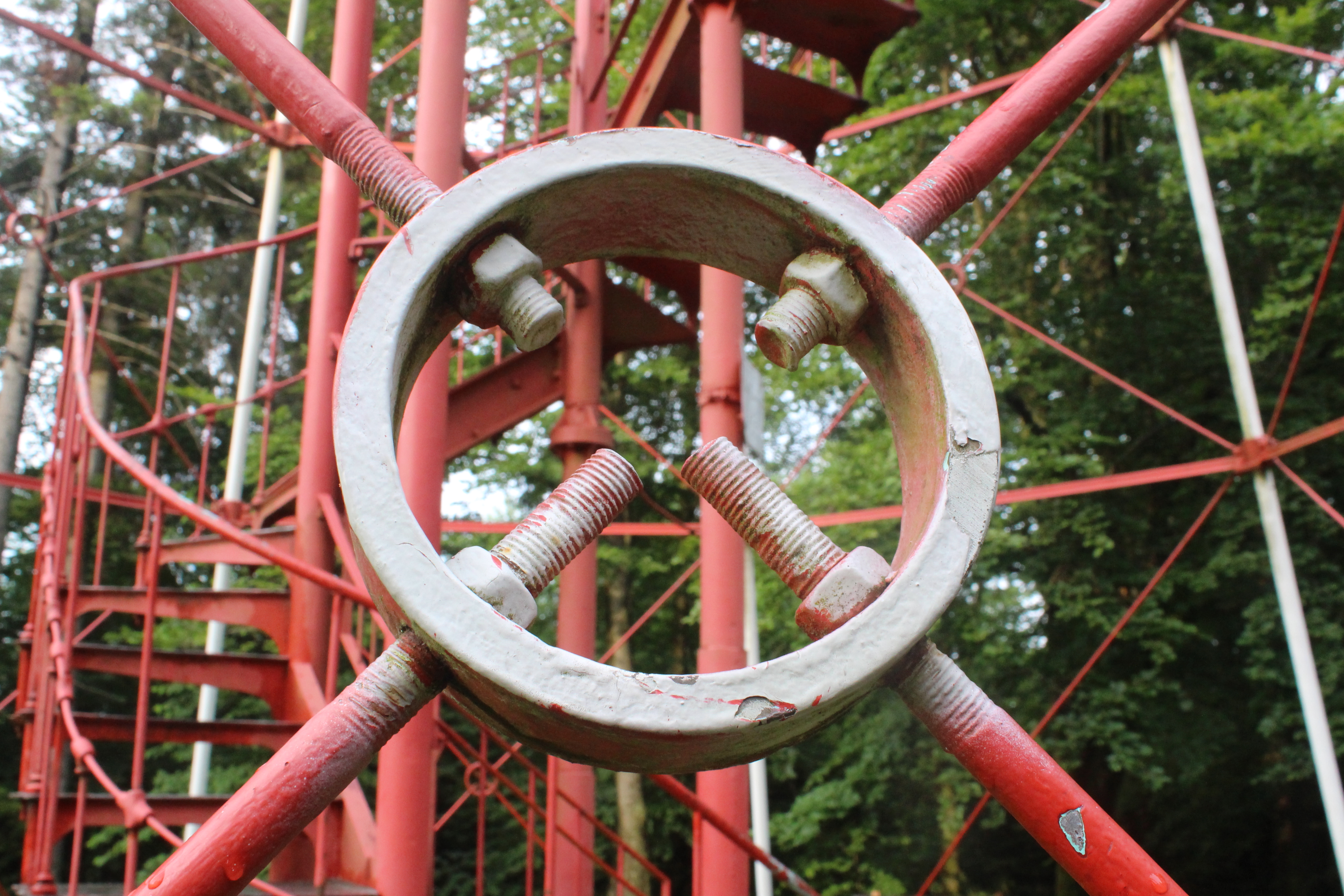
Connection of diagonal stays (being stretched) at an observation tower

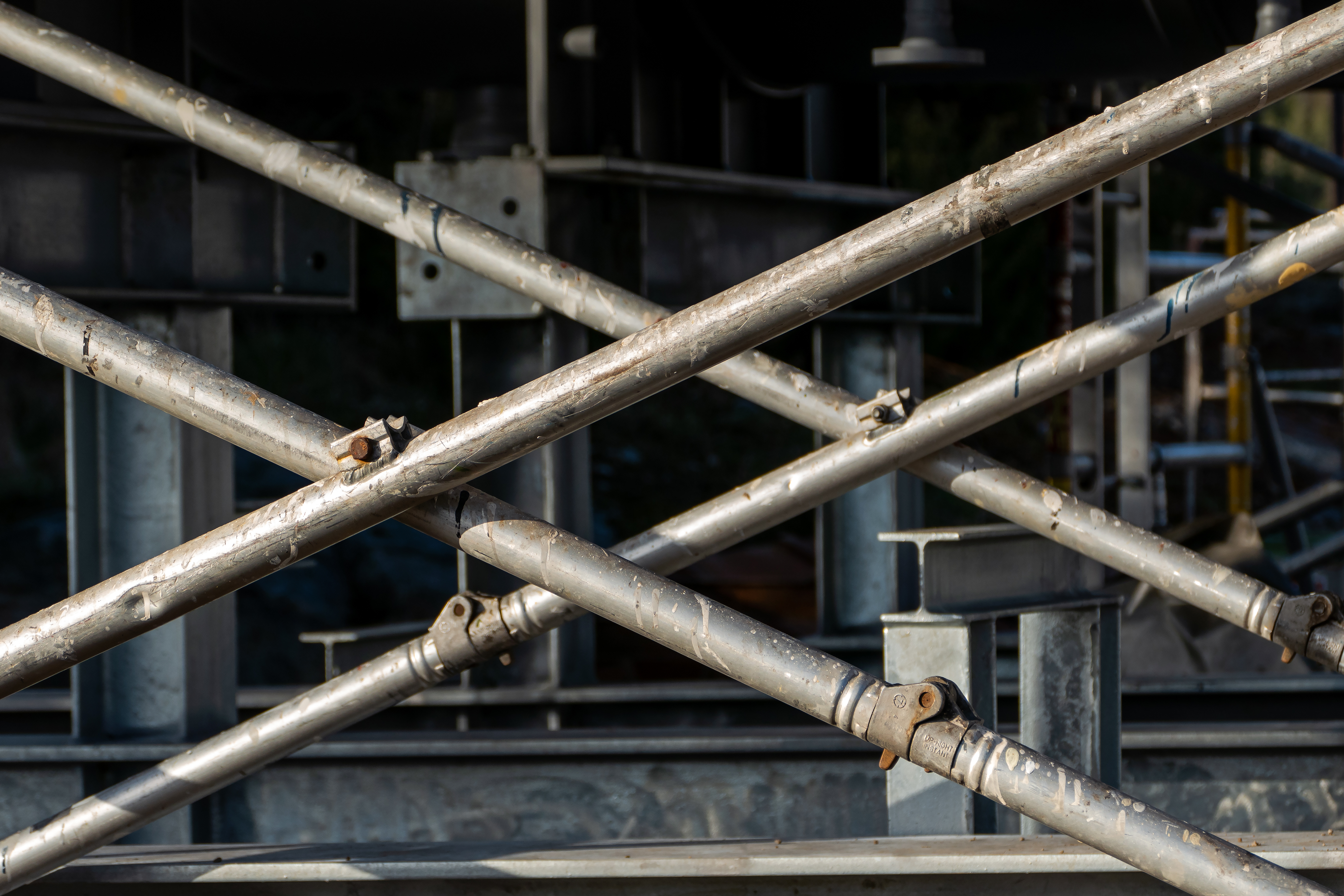
Part of scaffolding struts (being compressed) for construction work

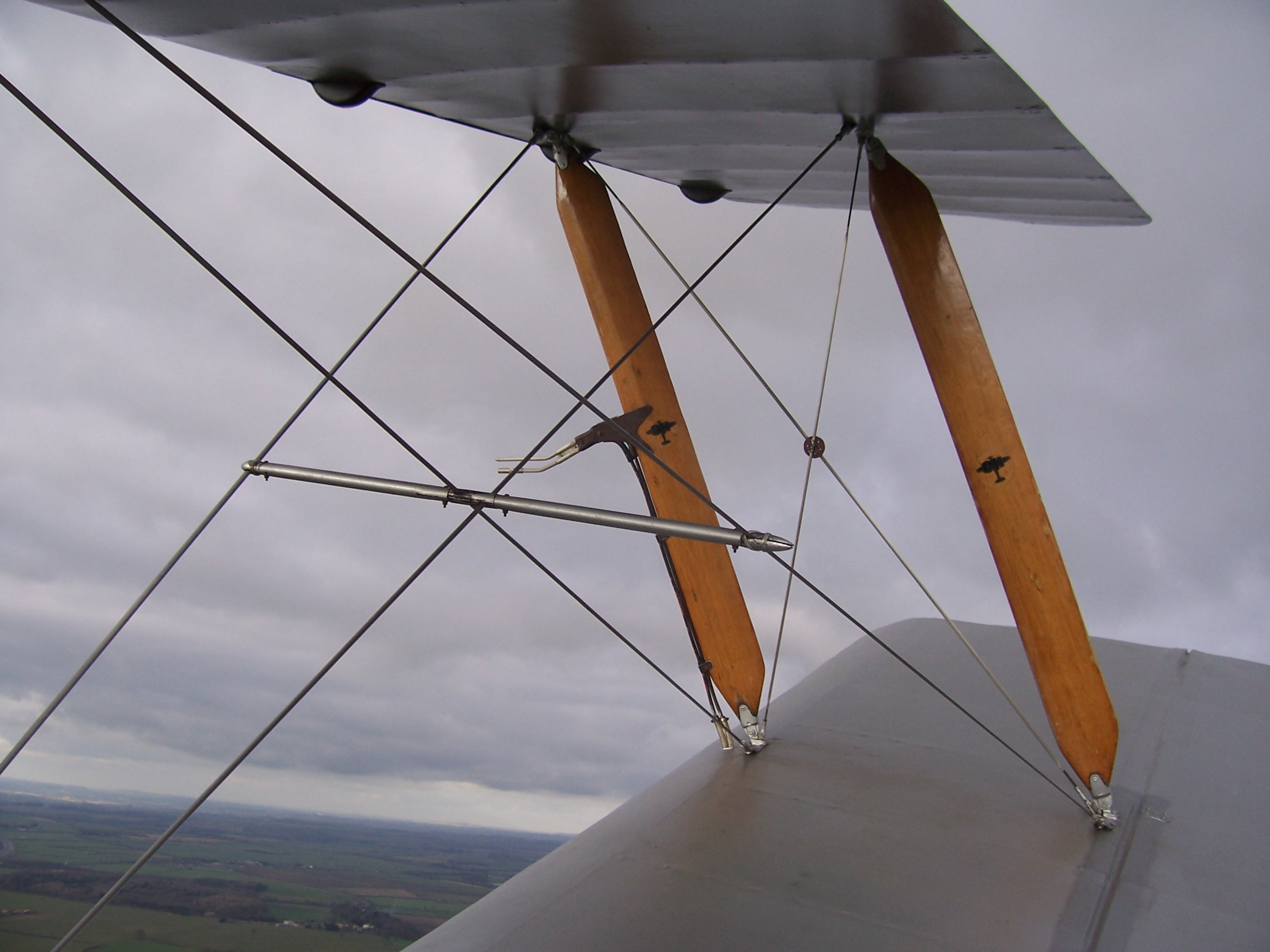
Yellow struts and wire rope stays on a de Havilland Tiger Moth

== See also ==
- Angle bracket (fastener), L-shaped structural fastener for fastening two objects together at an angle
- Wind brace, diagonal brace to tie the rafters of a roof together and prevent racking
