= Lookout (architecture) =

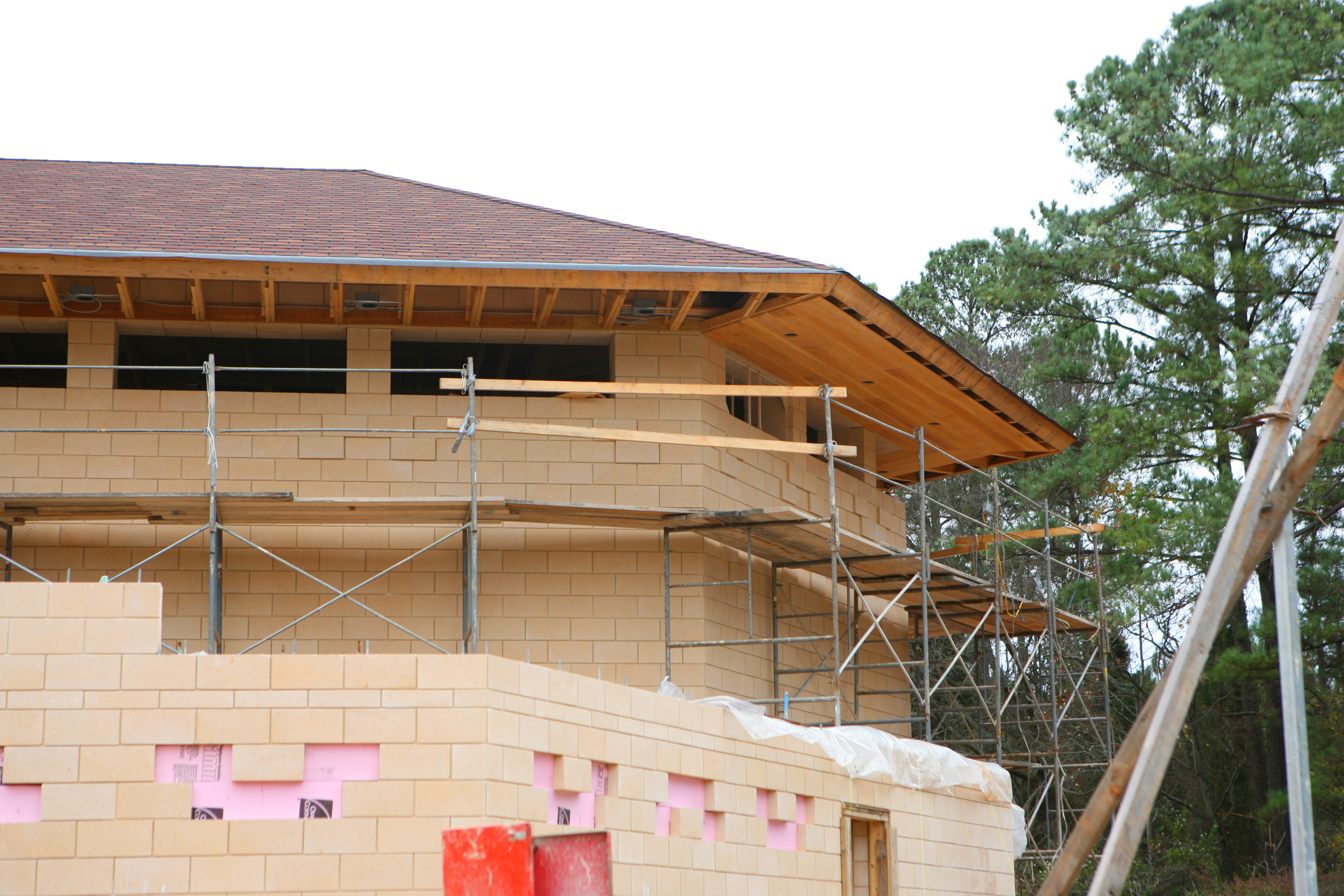
Photograph of lookouts in the construction of an exterior soffit. The lookouts extend horizontally from the wall plate to the subfascia and are visible above the upper windows. In this example the lookouts will be covered by the finished soffit, as can be seen on the right hand side of the image.

A lookout, lookout rafter or roof outlooker is a wooden joist that extends in cantilever out from the exterior wall (or wall plate) of a building, supporting the roof sheathing and providing a nailing surface for the fascia boards. When not exposed it serves to fasten the finish materials of the eaves.

== Construction and placement ==
A lookout (also called an outlooker or outrigger) is a horizontal framing member that extends from the end of a rafter to the exterior wall and supports soffit-facing materials.

In gable-roof construction, outlookers are typically 2x4 or 2x6 members installed across the tops of the gable truss or rafter and extended outward to carry the fascia board along the edge of the overhang. The overhang framing transfers loads from the roof edge back into the roof framing and is used as an alternative to ladder framing for deeper gable overhangs.

== Variations and related framing methods ==
Two common methods of framing gable roof overhangs are ladder framing and outrigger framing. Ladder framing consists of two parallel members connected by short blocks and is typically limited to shorter overhangs of 8 to 12 inches. Another method uses lookout blocks to connect the barge or fly rafter back to the gable framing; according to Simpson Strong-Tie, this ladder method is less wind-resistant and is limited in published literature to a 12-inch overhang. The same source states that cantilevered outlookers are permitted to extend up to 24 inches, whereas ladder outlookers are limited to 12 inches.
