= Eaves =

Protruding structure

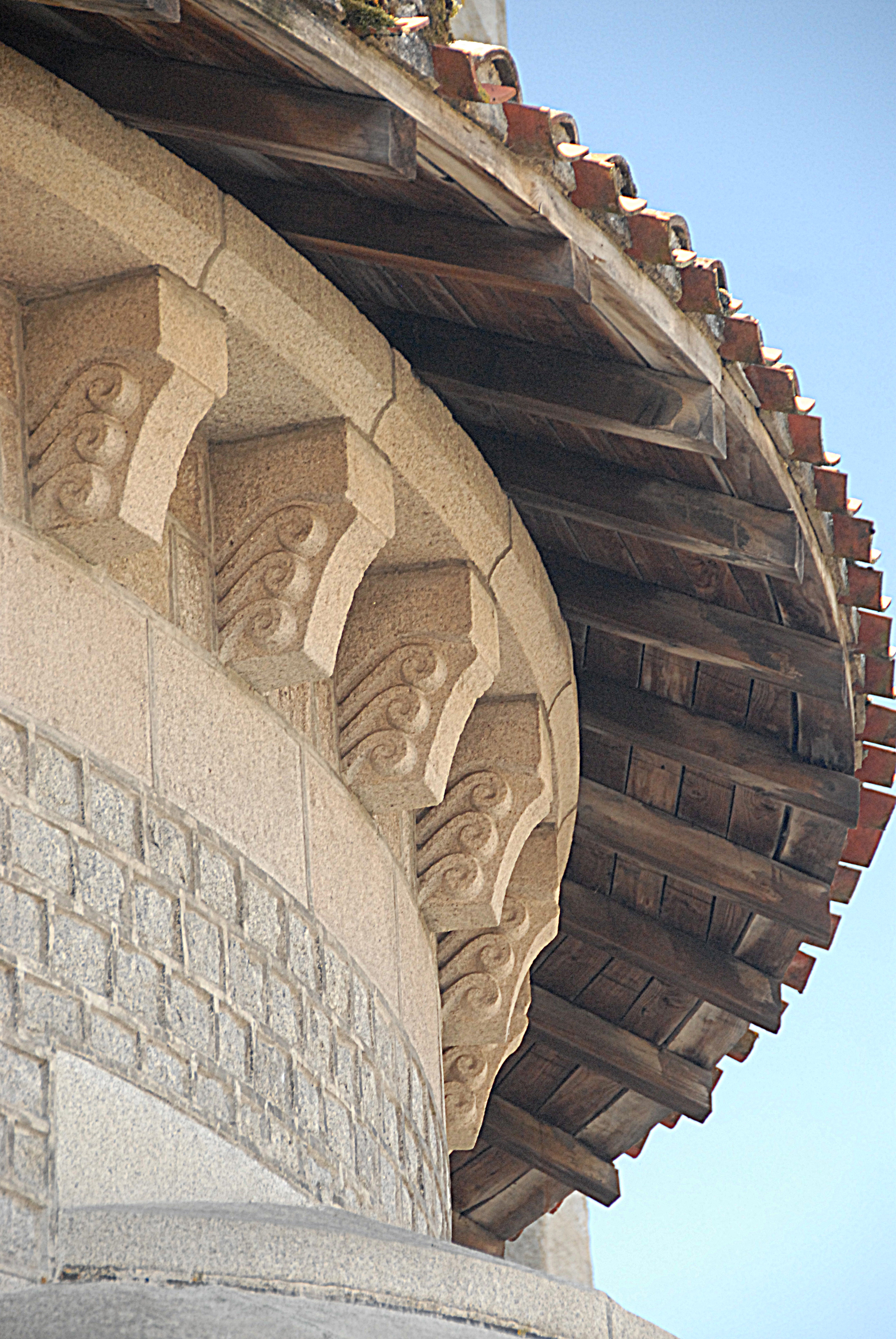
Eaves overhang, shown here with a bracket system of modillions

The eaves are the edges of the roof which overhang the face of a wall and, normally, project beyond the side of a building. The eaves form an overhang to throw water clear of the walls and may be highly decorated as part of an architectural style, such as the Chinese dougong bracket systems.

== Etymology and usage ==
According to the Oxford English Dictionary, eaves is derived from the Old English efes (singular), meaning "edge", and consequently forms both the singular and plural of the word. This Old English word is itself of Germanic origin, related to the German dialect Obsen, and also probably to over.

The Merriam-Webster dictionary lists the word as eave but notes that it is "usually used in plural".

== Function ==
The primary function of the eaves is to keep rain water off the walls and to prevent the ingress of water at the junction where the roof meets the wall. The eaves may also protect a pathway around the building from the rain, prevent erosion of the footings, and reduce splatter on the wall from rain as it hits the ground.

The secondary function is to control solar penetration as a form of passive solar building design; the eaves overhang can be designed to adjust the building's solar gain to suit the local climate, the latitude, and orientation of the building.

The eaves overhang may also shelter openings to ventilate the roof space.

== Design ==
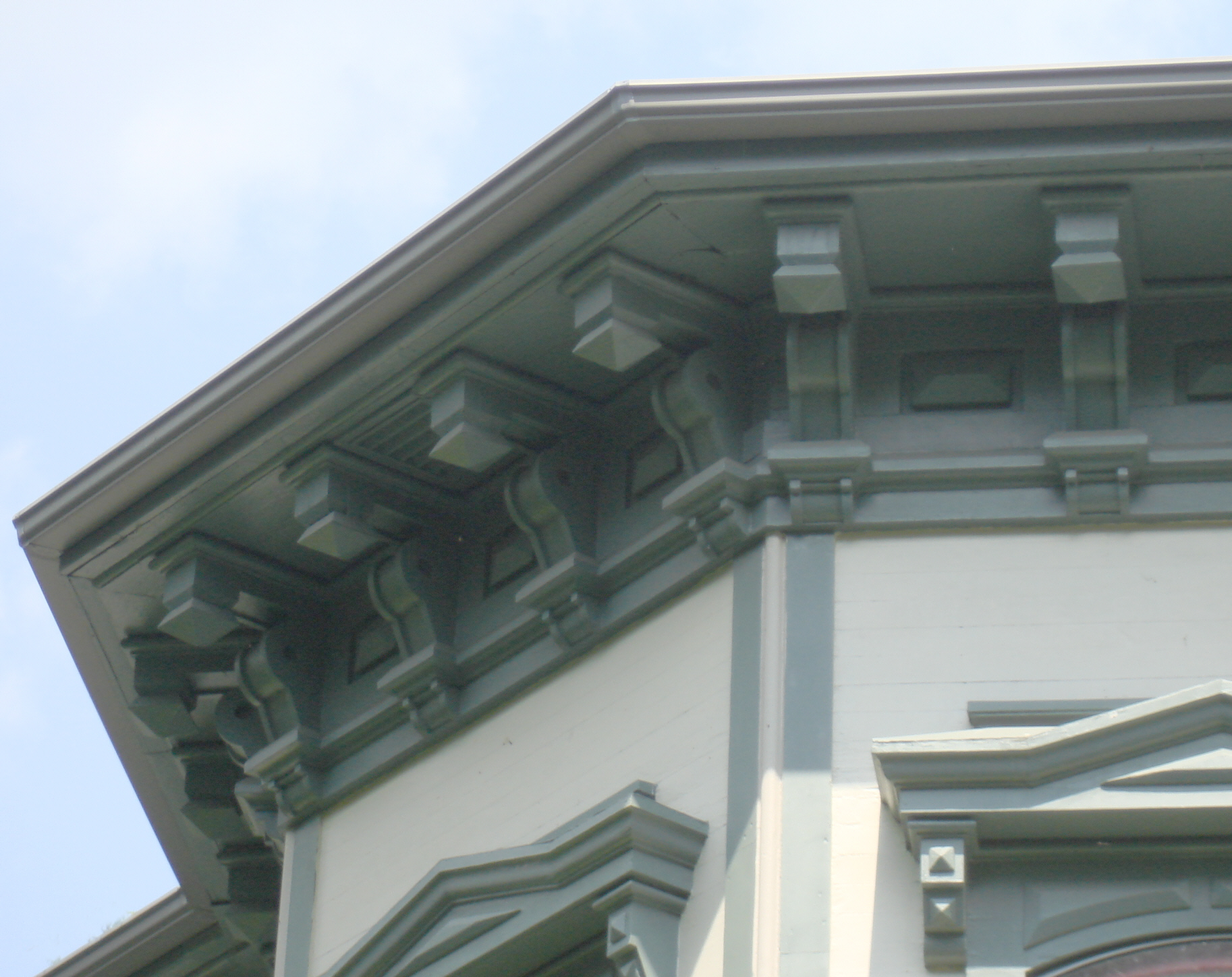
Italianate eaves with decorative support brackets

Aesthetic, traditional, or purely decorative considerations may prevail over the strictly functional requirements of the eaves. The Arts and Crafts Movement influenced the American Craftsman tradition, which has very wide eaves with decorative brackets technically called modillions, for which there is not necessarily a real functional need; likewise the Italian-style eaves.

The eaves may terminate in a fascia, a board running the length of the eaves under the tiles or roof sheets to cap off and protect the exposed rafter ends and to provide grounds on which to fix gutters. At the gables the eaves may extend beyond the gable end wall by projecting the purlins, or adding lookouts, and are usually capped off by bargeboards to protect the wall and the purlin ends. The overhang at the gable is referred to as a gable overhang, as opposed to eave overhang, or they both may be referred to as overhang.

The underside of the eaves may be filled with a horizontal soffit fixed at right angles to the wall, the soffit may be decorative but it also has the function of sealing the gap between the rafters from vermin and weather.

Eaves must be designed for local wind speeds as the overhang can significantly increase the wind loading on the roof.

The line on the ground under the outer edge of the eaves is the eavesdrip, or dripline, and in typical building planning regulations defines the extent of the building and cannot oversail the property boundary.

== See also ==
- Chhajja
- Gargoyle
- Leader head
- Lookout (architecture)
- Overhang (architecture)
