= Cuboctahedron =

Polyhedron with 8 triangles and 6 squares

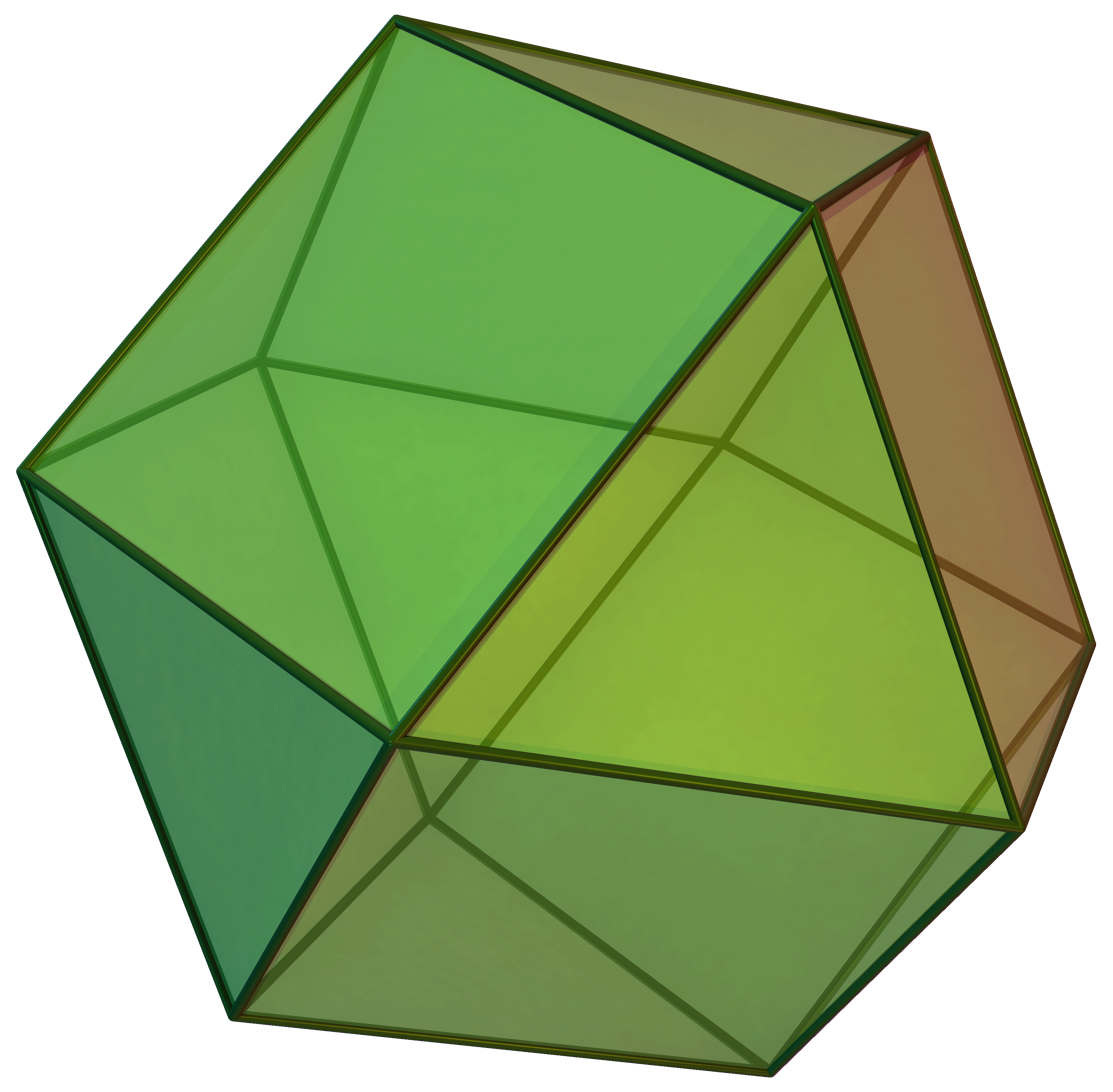
- Type: Archimedean solid
- Faces: 14
- Edges: 24
- Vertices: 12
- Vertex configuration: 3.4.3.4
- Schläfli symbol: r{4,3}
- Conway notation: aC
- Symmetry group: Octahedral $\mathrm{O}_\mathrm{h}$
- Dihedral angle (degrees): approximately 125°
- Dual polyhedron: Rhombic dodecahedron
- Properties: convex, vector equilibrium, Rupert property

Vertex figure

Net

A cuboctahedron, rectified cube, or rectified octahedron is a polyhedron with 8 triangular faces and 6 square faces. A cuboctahedron has 12 identical vertices, with 2 triangles and 2 squares meeting at each, and 24 identical edges, each separating a triangle from a square. As such, it is a quasiregular polyhedron, i.e., an Archimedean solid that is not only vertex-transitive but also edge-transitive. It is radially equilateral. Its dual polyhedron is the rhombic dodecahedron.

== Construction ==
The cuboctahedron can be constructed in many ways:

- Its construction can be started by attaching two regular triangular cupolas base-to-base. This is similar to one of the Johnson solids, triangular orthobicupola. The difference is that the triangular orthobicupola is constructed with one of the cupolas twisted so that similar polygonal faces are adjacent, whereas the cuboctahedron is not. As a result, the cuboctahedron may also called the triangular gyrobicupola.
- Its construction can be started from a cube or a regular octahedron, marking the midpoints of their edges, and cutting off all the vertices at those points. This process is known as rectification, making the cuboctahedron being named the rectified cube and rectified octahedron.
- An alternative construction is by cutting off all vertices (truncation) of a regular tetrahedron and beveling the edges. This process is termed cantellation, lending the cuboctahedron an alternate name of cantellated tetrahedron.

Cantellation of a regular tetrahedron into a cuboctahedron

From all of these constructions, the cuboctahedron has 14 faces: 8 equilateral triangles and 6 squares. It also has 24 edges and 12 vertices.

The Cartesian coordinates for the vertices of a cuboctahedron with edge length $\sqrt{2}$ centered at the origin are the permutations of $(0, \pm 1, \pm 1)$, $(\pm 1, 0, \pm 1)$, and $(\pm 1, \pm 1, 0)$

== Properties ==
=== Measurement and other metric properties ===
The surface area of a cuboctahedron $A$ can be determined by summing all the area of its polygonal faces. The volume of a cuboctahedron $V$ can be determined by slicing it off into two regular triangular cupolas, summing up their volume. Given that the edge length $a$, its surface area and volume are:
$$\begin{align}
A &= \left(6+2\sqrt{3}\right)a^2 &&\approx 9.464a^2 \\
V &= \frac{5 \sqrt{2}}{3} a^3 &&\approx 2.357a^3.
\end{align}$$

The dihedral angle of a cuboctahedron can be calculated with the angle of triangular cupolas. The dihedral angle of a triangular cupola between square-to-triangle is approximately 125°, that between square-to-hexagon is 54.7°, and that between triangle-to-hexagon is 70.5°. Therefore, the dihedral angle of a cuboctahedron between square-to-triangle, on the edge where the base of two triangular cupolas are attached is 54.7° + 70.5° approximately 125°. Therefore, the dihedral angle of a cuboctahedron between square-to-triangle is approximately 125°. The exact angle is $\arccos(-1/\sqrt{3})$.

The process of jitterbug transformation

Buckminster Fuller noted that cuboctahedron has the rare property that the distance from the center to the vertex is the same as the length of its edges. In other words, it has the same length vectors in three-dimensional space, known as vector equilibrium. The rigid struts and the flexible vertices of a cuboctahedron may also be transformed progressively into a regular icosahedron, regular octahedron, regular tetrahedron. Fuller named this the jitterbug transformation.

A cuboctahedron has the Rupert property, meaning there is a polyhedron of the same or larger size that can pass through its hole.

=== Symmetry and classification ===
3D model of a cuboctahedron

The cuboctahedron is an Archimedean solid, meaning it is a highly symmetric and semi-regular polyhedron, and two or more different regular polygonal faces meet in a vertex. The cuboctahedron has two symmetries, resulting from the constructions as has mentioned above: the same symmetry as the regular octahedron or cube, the octahedral symmetry $\mathrm{O}_\mathrm{h}$, and the same symmetry as the regular tetrahedron, tetrahedral symmetry $\mathrm{T}_\mathrm{d}$. The polygonal faces that meet for every vertex are two equilateral triangles and two squares, and the vertex figure of a cuboctahedron is 3.4.3.4. The dual of a cuboctahedron is rhombic dodecahedron.

=== Radial equilateral symmetry ===
In a cuboctahedron, the long radius (center to vertex) is the same as the edge length; thus its long diameter (vertex to opposite vertex) is 2 edge lengths. Its center is like the apical vertex of a canonical pyramid: one edge length away from all the other vertices. (In the case of the cuboctahedron, the center is in fact the apex of 6 square and 8 triangular pyramids). This radial equilateral symmetry is a property of only a few uniform polytopes, including the two-dimensional hexagon, the three-dimensional cuboctahedron, and the four-dimensional 24-cell and 8-cell (tesseract). Radially equilateral polytopes are those that can be constructed, with their long radii, from equilateral triangles which meet at the center of the polytope, each contributing two radii and an edge. Therefore, all the interior elements which meet at the center of these polytopes have equilateral triangle inward faces, as in the dissection of the cuboctahedron into 6 square pyramids and 8 tetrahedra.

Each of these radially equilateral polytopes also occurs as cells of a characteristic space-filling tessellation: the tiling of regular hexagons, the rectified cubic honeycomb (of alternating cuboctahedra and octahedra), the 24-cell honeycomb and the tesseractic honeycomb, respectively. Each tessellation has a dual tessellation; the cell centers in a tessellation are cell vertices in its dual tessellation. The densest known regular sphere-packing in two, three and four dimensions uses the cell centers of one of these tessellations as sphere centers.

Because it is radially equilateral, the cuboctahedron's center is one edge length distant from the 12 vertices.

== Configuration matrix ==
The cuboctahedron can be represented as a configuration matrix with elements grouped by symmetry transitivity classes. A configuration matrix is a matrix in which the rows and columns correspond to the elements of a polyhedron as in the vertices, edges, and faces. The diagonal of a matrix denotes the number of each element that appears in a polyhedron, whereas the non-diagonal of a matrix denotes the number of the column's elements that occur in or at the row's element.

The cuboctahedron has 1 transitivity class of 12 vertices, 1 class of 24 edges, and 2 classes of faces: 8 triangular and 6 square; each element in a matrix's diagonal. The 24 edges can be seen in 4 central hexagons.

With octahedral symmetry (orbifold 432), the squares have the 4-fold symmetry, triangles the 3-fold symmetry, and vertices the 2-fold symmetry. With tetrahedral symmetry (orbifold 332) the 24 vertices split into 2 edge classes, and the 8 triangles split into 2 face classes. The square symmetry is reduced to 2-fold.

Octahedral symmetry (432)
Tetrahedral symmetry (332)

Configuration
(432)	v_{1}	e_{1}	f_{1}	f_{2}
v_{1 (Z_{2})}	12	4	2	2
e_{1}	2	24	1	1
f_{1 (Z_{3})}	3	3	8	*
f_{2 (Z_{4})}	4	4	*	6

Configuration
(332)	v_{1}	e_{1}	e_{2}	f_{1}	f_{2}	f_{3}
v_{1}	12	2	2	1	1	2
e_{1}	2	12	*	1	0	1
e_{2}	2	*	12	0	1	1
f_{1 (Z_{3})}	3	3	0	4	*	*
f_{2 (Z_{3})}	3	0	3	*	4	*
f_{3 (Z_{2})}	4	2	2	*	*	6

== Graph ==
The skeleton of a cuboctahedron may be represented as the graph, one of the Archimedean graphs. It has 12 vertices and 24 edges. It is quartic graph, which is four vertices connecting each vertex.

It has Hamiltonian paths. One example is shown below mapped onto a 16-gon perimeter, elements colored by transitivity positions.

The graph of a cuboctahedron may be constructed as the line graph of the cubical graph, showing that it is a locally linear graph.

The 24 edges can be partitioned into 2 sets isomorphic to tetrahedral symmetry. The edges can also be partitioned into 4 hexagonal cycles, representing centrosymmetry, with only opposite vertices and edges in the same transitivity class.

Octahedral (48 automorphism)
Tetrahedral (24 aut)
Centrosymmetric (2 aut)
Hamiltonian cycle on perimeter

Configuration
\	v_{1}	e_{1}
v_{1}	12	4
e_{1}	2	24

Configuration
\	v_{1}	e_{1}	e_{2}
v_{1}	12	2	2
e_{1}	2	12	*
e_{2}	2	*	12

Configuration
\	v_{1}	v_{2}	v_{3}	e_{1}	e_{2}	e_{3}
v_{1}	4	*	*	2	2	0
v_{2}	*	4	*	0	2	2
v_{3}	*	*	4	2	0	2
e_{1}	1	0	1	8	*	*
e_{2}	1	1	0	*	8	*
e_{3}	0	1	1	*	*	8

== Related polyhedra and honeycomb ==
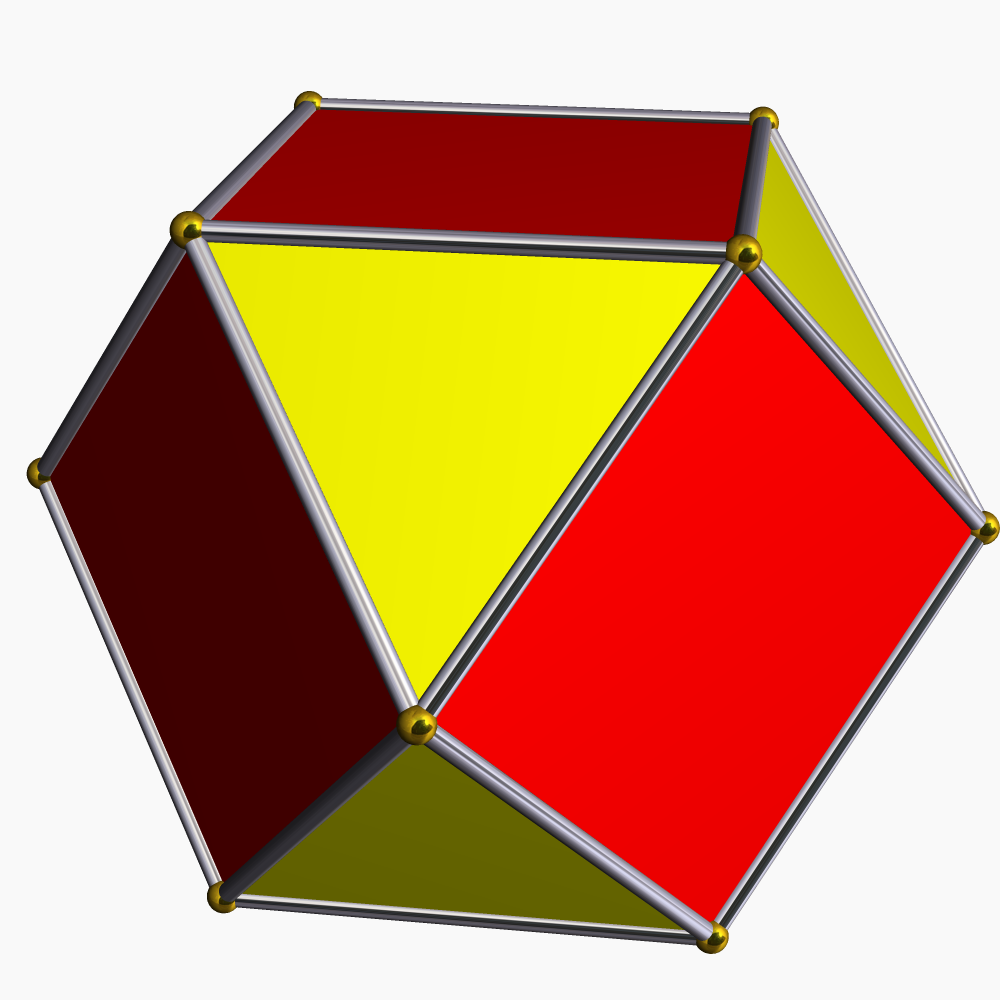
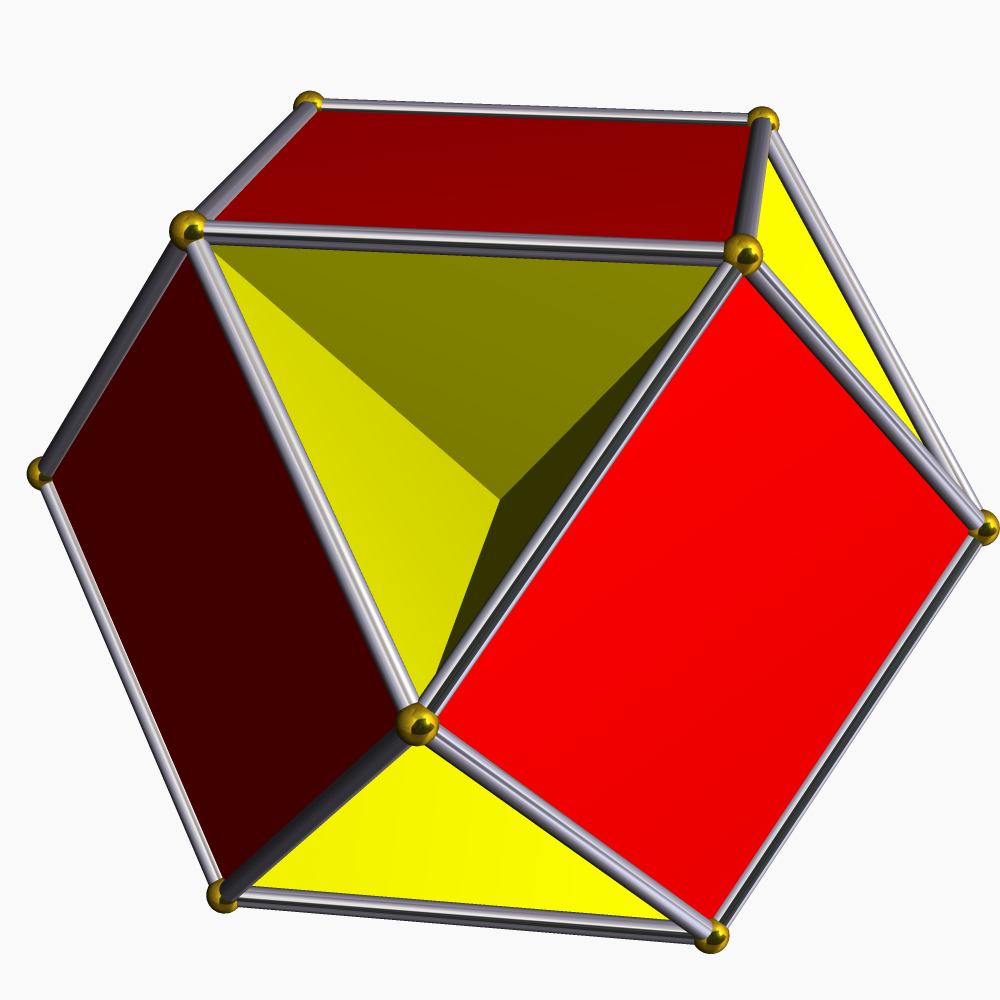
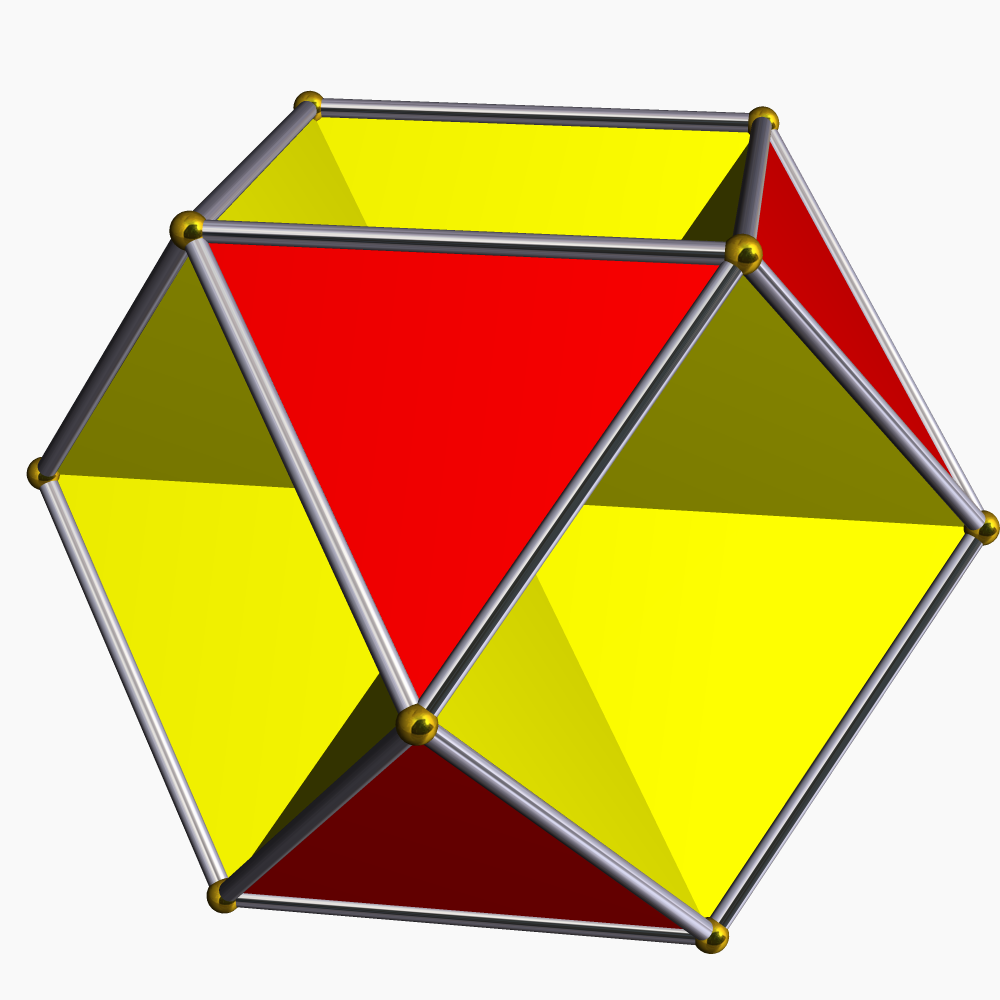
The cuboctahedron, cubohemioctahedron, and octahemioctahedron.

The cuboctahedron shares its skeleton with the two nonconvex uniform polyhedra, the cubohemioctahedron and octahemioctahedron. These polyhedrons are constructed from the skeleton of a cuboctahedron in which the four hexagonal planes bisect its diagonal, intersecting its interior. Adding six squares or eight equilateral triangles results in the cubohemicotahedron or octahemioctahedron, respectively.

The cuboctahedron 2-covers the tetrahemihexahedron, which accordingly has the same abstract vertex figure (two triangles and two squares: $3 \cdot 4 \cdot 3 \cdot 4$) and half the vertices, edges, and faces. (The actual vertex figure of the tetrahemihexahedron is $3 \cdot 4 \cdot \frac{3}{2} \cdot 4$, with the $\frac{a}{2}$ factor due to the cross.)

The dissection into square pyramids and tetrahedrons

The cuboctahedron can be dissected into 6 square pyramids and 8 tetrahedra meeting at a central point. This dissection is expressed in the tetrahedral-octahedral honeycomb where pairs of square pyramids are combined into octahedra.

== Kinematics ==
Progressions between a cuboctahedron, icosahedron, and octahedron. The cuboctahedron can flex this way even if its edges (but not its faces) are rigid.

The skeleton of a cuboctahedron, considering its edges as rigid beams connected at flexible joints at its vertices but omitting its faces, does not have structural rigidity. Consequently, its vertices can be repositioned by folding (changing the dihedral angle) at the edges and face diagonals. The cuboctahedron's kinematics is noteworthy in that its vertices can be repositioned to the vertex positions of the regular icosahedron, the Jessen's icosahedron, and the regular octahedron, in accordance with the pyritohedral symmetry of the icosahedron.

=== Rigid and kinematic cuboctahedra ===
When interpreted as a framework of rigid flat faces, connected along the edges by hinges, the cuboctahedron is a rigid structure, as are all convex polyhedra, by Cauchy's theorem. However, when the faces are removed, leaving only rigid edges connected by flexible joints at the vertices, the result is not a rigid system (unlike polyhedra whose faces are all triangles, to which Cauchy's theorem applies despite the missing faces).

Adding a central vertex, connected by rigid edges to all the other vertices, subdivides the cuboctahedron into square pyramids and regular tetrahedra, meeting at the central vertex. Unlike the cuboctahedron itself, the resulting system of edges and joints is rigid, and forms the vertex figure of the infinite tetrahedral-octahedral honeycomb.

=== Cyclical cuboctahedron transformations ===
The cuboctahedron can be transformed cyclically through four polyhedra, repeating the cycle endlessly. Topologically, the transformation follows a Möbius loop: it is an orientable double cover of the octahedron. Physically, it is a spinor.

In their spatial relationships the cuboctahedron, icosahedron, Jessen's icosahedron, and octahedron nest like Russian dolls and are related by a helical contraction. The contraction begins with the square faces of the cuboctahedron folding inward along their diagonals to form pairs of triangles. The 12 vertices of the cuboctahedron spiral inward (toward the center) and move closer together until they reach the points where they form a regular icosahedron; they move slightly closer together until they form a Jessen's icosahedron; and they continue to spiral toward each other until they coincide in pairs as the 6 vertices of the octahedron.

The general cuboctahedron transformation can be parameterized along a continuum of special-case transformations with two limit cases: one in which the edges of the cuboctahedron are rigid, and one in which they are elastic.

=== Rigid-edge transformation ===
Continuous transformation between the cuboctahedron and the octahedron pausing at the vertex position of the regular icosahedron.

The rigid-edge cuboctahedron transformation symmetrically transforms the cuboctahedron into a regular icosahedron, a Jessen's icosahedron, and a regular octahedron, in the sense that the polyhedron's vertices take on the vertex positions of those polyhedra successively.

The cuboctahedron does not actually become those other polyhedra, and they cannot transform into each other (if they have rigid edges), because unlike the cuboctahedron they do have structural rigidity as a consequence of having only triangular faces.

What the cuboctahedron with rigid edges actually can transform into (and through) is a regular icosahedron from which 6 edges are missing (a pseudoicosahedron), a Jessen's icosahedron in which the 6 reflex edges are missing or elastic, and a double cover of the octahedron that has two coincident rigid edges connecting each pair of vertices (formed by making pairs of cuboctahedron vertices coincide).

=== Elastic-edge transformation ===
There is a tensegrity polyhedron that embodies and enforces the closely related elastic-edge cuboctahedron transformation. The tensegrity icosahedron has a dynamic structural rigidity called infinitesimal mobility and can only be deformed into symmetrical polyhedra along that spectrum from cuboctahedron to octahedron. It is called the tensegrity icosahedron because its median stable form is Jessen's icosahedron.

Jessen's icosahedron

Although the transformation is described above as a contraction of the cuboctahedron, the stable equilibrium point of the tensegrity is Jessen's icosahedron; the tensegrity icosahedron resists being deformed from that shape and can only be forced to expand or contract from it to the extent that its edges are elastic (able to lengthen under tension). Forcing the polyhedron away from its stable resting shape (in either direction) involves stretching its 24 short edges slightly and equally. Force applied to any pair of parallel long edges, to move them closer together or farther apart, is transferred automatically to stretch all the short edges uniformly, shrinking the polyhedron from its medium-sized Jessen's icosahedron toward the smaller octahedron, or expanding it toward the larger regular icosahedron and still larger cuboctahedron, respectively. Releasing the force causes the polyhedron to spring back to its Jessen's icosahedron resting shape.

In the elastic-edge transformation the cuboctahedron edges are not rigid (though Jessen's icosahedron's 6 long edges are). What the cuboctahedron transforms into is a regular icosahedron of shorter radius and shorter edge length, a Jessen's icosahedron of still shorter radius and (minimum) edge length, and finally an octahedron of still shorter radius but the same (maximum) edge length as the cuboctahedron (but only after the edges have shortened and lengthened again, and come together in coincident pairs).

=== Duality of the rigid-edge and elastic-edge transformations ===
The rigid-edge and elastic-edge cuboctahedron transformations differ only in having reciprocal parameters: in the elastic-edge transformation the Jessen's icosahedron's short edges stretch and its long edges are rigid, and in the rigid-edge transformation its long edges compress and its short edges are rigid. Everything in the descriptions above except the metrics applies to all cuboctahedron transformations. In particular, the vertices always move in helices toward the center as the cuboctahedron transforms into the octahedron, and Jessen's icosahedron (with 90° dihedral angles and three invariant orthogonal planes) is always the median point, stable to the extent that there is resistance to stretching or compressing.

The elastic-edge cuboctahedron transformation is usually given as the mathematics of the tensegrity icosahedron because it comes closest to modeling how most actual tensegrity icosahedron structures behave. However, one could certainly construct a tensegrity icosahedron in which the short edges (cables) were perfectly inelastic, and the long edges (struts) were compressible springs. Such a tensegrity would perform the rigid-edge cuboctahedron transformation.

Finally, both transformations are pure abstractions, the two limit cases of an infinite family of cuboctahedron transformations in which there are two elasticity parameters and no requirement that one of them be 0. Neither limit case is apt to apply perfectly to most real tensegrity structures, which usually have some elasticity in both the cables and the struts, giving their actual behavior metrics that are non-trivial to calculate. In engineering practice, only a tiny amount of elasticity is required to allow a significant degree of motion, so most tensegrity structures are constructed to be "drum-tight" using nearly inelastic struts and cables. A tensegrity icosahedron transformation is a kinematic cuboctahedron transformation with reciprocal small elasticity parameters.

=== Jitterbug transformations ===
The twisting, expansive-contractive transformations between these polyhedra were named Jitterbug transformations by Buckminster Fuller. Fuller did not give any mathematics; like many great geometers before him (Alicia Boole Stott for example) he did not have any mathematics to give. But he was the first to stress the importance of the cuboctahedron's radial equilateral symmetry which he applied structurally (and patented) as the octet truss, intuiting that it plays a fundamental role not only in structural integrity but in the dimensional relationships between polytopes. He discovered the symmetry transformations of the cuboctahedron, understood their relationship to the tensegrity icosahedron, and even gave demonstrations of the rigid-edge cuboctahedron transformation before audiences (in the days before computer-rendered animations). His demonstration with commentary of the "vector equilibrium", as he called the cuboctahedron, is still far more illuminating than the animations in this article.

== History ==
The cuboctahedron was probably known to Plato: Heron's Definitiones quotes Archimedes as saying that Plato knew of a solid made of 8 triangles and 6 squares.

== Bibliography ==
- Fuller, R. Buckminster (1975). "Vector Equilibrium". Everything I Know Sessions. Philadelphia.
- Kenner, Hugh (1976). Geodesic Math and How to Use It. University of California Press. ISBN 978-0520029248.
- Itoh, Jin-ichi; Nara, Chie (2021). "Continuous flattening of the 2-dimensional skeleton of a regular 24-cell". Journal of Geometry. 112 (13). doi:10.1007/s00022-021-00575-6. hdl:10291/0002001802.
- Gunn, Charles; Sullivan, John M. (2008), "The Borromean Rings: A video about the New IMU logo", in Sarhangi, Reza; Séquin, Carlo H. (eds.), Bridges Leeuwarden: Mathematics, Music, Art, Architecture, Culture, London: Tarquin Publications, pp. 63–70, ISBN 978-0-9665201-9-4; see the video itself at "The Borromean Rings: A new logo for the IMU Archived 2021-03-08 at the Wayback Machine", International Mathematical Union
- Koca, Nazife; Al-Mukhaini, Aida; Koca, Mehmet; Al Qanobi, Amal (2016-12-01). "Symmetry of the Pyritohedron and Lattices". Sultan Qaboos University Journal for Science. 21 (2): 139. doi:10.24200/squjs.vol21iss2pp139-149.
