= Regular icosahedron =

Solid with twenty equal triangular faces

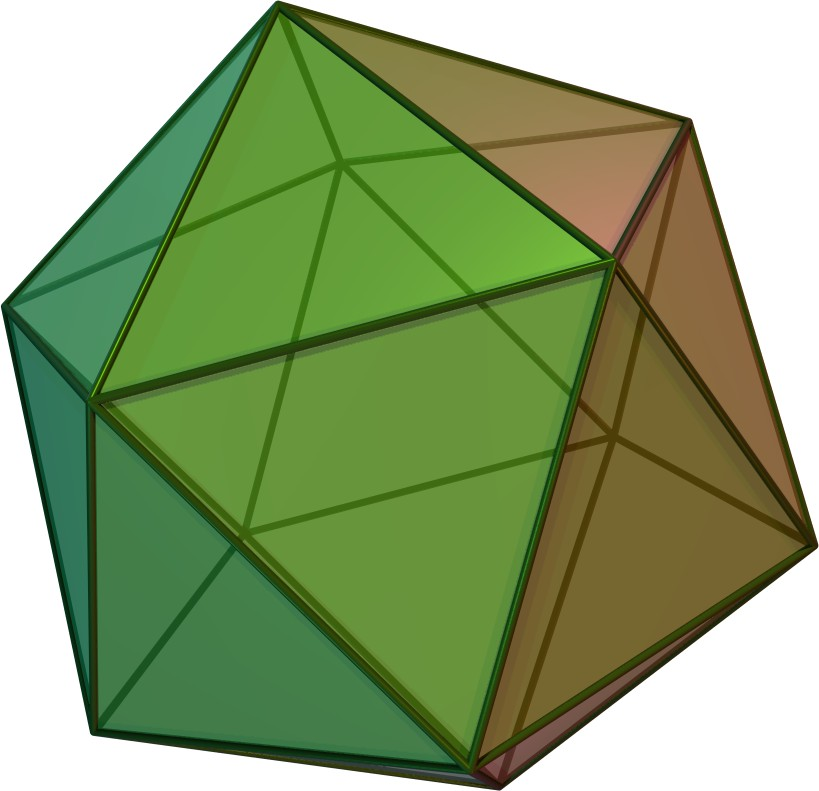
- Type: Deltahedron, Gyroelongated bipyramid, Platonic solid, Regular polyhedron
- Faces: 20 equilateral triangles
- Edges: 30
- Vertices: 12
- Vertex configuration: $12 \times \left(3^5 \right)$
- Schläfli symbol: $\{3,5\}$
- Symmetry group: icosahedral symmetry $\mathrm{I}_\mathrm{h}$
- Dihedral angle (degrees): 138.190 (approximately)
- Dual polyhedron: regular dodecahedron
- Properties: convex, composite, isogonal, isohedral, isotoxal

Net

The regular icosahedron (or simply icosahedron) is a convex polyhedron that can be constructed from a pentagonal antiprism by attaching two pentagonal pyramids with regular faces to each of its pentagonal faces, or by putting points onto the cube. The resulting polyhedron has 20 equilateral triangles as its faces, 30 edges, and 12 vertices. It is an example of a Platonic solid and of a deltahedron. The icosahedral graph represents the skeleton of a regular icosahedron.

Many polyhedra and other related figures are constructed from the regular icosahedron, including its 59 stellations. The great dodecahedron, one of the Kepler–Poinsot polyhedra, is constructed by either stellation of the regular dodecahedron or faceting of the icosahedron. Some of the Johnson solids can be constructed by removing the pentagonal pyramids. The regular icosahedron's dual polyhedron is the regular dodecahedron, and their relation has a historical background in the comparison mensuration. It is analogous to a four-dimensional polytope, the 600-cell.

Regular icosahedra occur both in natural and human-made objects. A notable natural example is the adenovirus, while human applications include cartography (where its net shape is employed) and the twenty-sided dice that may have been used in ancient times but are now commonplace in modern tabletop role-playing games.

== Construction ==
The regular icosahedron is a twenty-sided polyhedron wherein the faces are equilateral triangles. It is one of the eight convex deltahedra, a polyhedron wherein all of its faces are equilateral triangles. Variously, it can be constructed as follows:

- Started by attaching two pentagonal pyramids with regular faces to the base of a pentagonal antiprism. These components are elementaries—they cannot be disintegrated into smaller convex polyhedra with regular faces again. Replacing bases of a pentagonal antiprism with ten triangular pyramids, the regular icosahedron is classified as a composite polyhedron, the opposite of an elementary polyhedron. This construction led to the alternative names called bicapped pentagonal antiprism, or gyroelongated pentagonal bipyramid due to its construction process through gyroelongation—polyhedra construction by attaching two pyramids onto the base of an antiprism.

Three mutually perpendicular golden rectangles, with edges connecting their corners, form a regular icosahedron.

- The twelve vertices of a regular icosahedron describe the three mutually perpendicular golden rectangular planes, whose corners are connected. These rectangular planes can be constructed from a pair of vertices located on the midpoints of the opposite edges on a cube's surface, drawing a segment line between those two, and divides the segment line in a golden ratio $\varphi = (1 + \sqrt{5})/2$ from its midpoint. Both the vertices of a regular icosahedron have an edge length of 2 and the three planes can be illustrated through Cartesian coordinate system:
  $$\left(0, \pm 1, \pm \varphi \right), \left(\pm 1, \pm \varphi, 0 \right), \left(\pm \varphi, 0, \pm 1 \right).$$
- One can snub a regular octahedron, by separating all of its faces and filling them with more equilateral triangles. As suggested by the process, the regular icosahedron is also known as snub octahedron.

The regular icosahedron can be unfolded into 43,380 different nets. The earliest net appeared in Albrecht Dürer's Painter's Manual in 1525.

== Properties ==
=== Surface area and volume ===
3D model of a regular icosahedron

The surface area of a polyhedron is the sum of the areas of its faces. In the case of a regular icosahedron, its surface area $A$ is twenty times that of each of its equilateral triangle faces. Its volume $V$ can be obtained as twenty times that of a pyramid whose base is one of its faces and whose apex is the regular icosahedron's center; or as the sum of the volume of two uniform pentagonal pyramids and a pentagonal antiprism. Given that the edge length $a$ of a regular icosahedron, both expressions are:
$$A = 5\sqrt{3}a^2 \approx 8.660a^2, \qquad
V = \frac{5 \varphi^2}{6}a^3 \approx 2.182a^3.$$

=== Relation to the spheres ===
The insphere of a convex polyhedron is a sphere touching every polyhedron's face within. The circumsphere of a convex polyhedron is a sphere that contains the polyhedron and touches every vertex. The midsphere of a convex polyhedron is a sphere tangent to every edge. Given that the edge length $a$ of a regular icosahedron, the radius of insphere (inradius) $r_I$, the radius of circumsphere (circumradius) $r_C$, and the radius of midsphere (midradius) $r_M$ are, respectively:
$$r_I = \frac{\varphi^2 a}{2 \sqrt{3}} \approx 0.756a, \qquad
r_C = \frac{\sqrt{\varphi^2 + 1}}{2}a \approx 0.951a, \qquad
r_M = \frac{\varphi}{2}a \approx 0.809a.$$

A problem dating back to the ancient Greeks is determining which of two shapes has a larger volume: a regular icosahedron inscribed in a sphere, or a regular dodecahedron inscribed in the same sphere. The problem was solved by Hero, Pappus, and Fibonacci, among others. Apollonius of Perga discovered the curious result that the ratio of volumes of these two shapes is the same as the ratio of their surface areas. Both volumes have formulas involving the golden ratio, but taken to different powers. As it turns out, the regular icosahedron occupies less of the sphere's volume (60.54%) than the regular dodecahedron (66.49%). (Note: Numerical values for the volumes of the inscribed Platonic solids may be found in Buker & Eggleton 1969.)

=== Other measurements ===
The dihedral angle of a regular icosahedron is $2\arcsin(\varphi/\sqrt{3}) \approx 138.19^\circ$, obtained by adding the angle of pentagonal pyramids with regular faces and a pentagonal antiprism. The dihedral angle of a pentagonal antiprism and pentagonal pyramid between two adjacent triangular faces is approximately 38.2°. The dihedral angle of a pentagonal antiprism between pentagon-to-triangle is 100.8°, and the dihedral angle of a pentagonal pyramid between the same faces is 37.4°. Therefore, for the regular icosahedron, the dihedral angle between two adjacent triangles, on the edge where the pentagonal pyramid and pentagonal antiprism are attached, is 37.4° + 100.8° = 138.2°.

The regular icosahedron has three types of closed geodesics. These are paths on its surface that are locally straight: they avoid the polyhedron's vertices, follow line segments across the faces that they cross, and form complementary angles on the two incident faces of each edge that they cross. The first geodesic forms a regular decagon perpendicular to the longest diagonal and has the length $5$. The other two geodesics are non-planar, with lengths $3\sqrt{3} \approx 5.196$ and $2\sqrt{7} \approx 5.292$.

=== Symmetry ===
Illustration of an icosahedral symmetry. The five-fold, three-fold, and two-fold are labeled in blue, red, and magenta, respectively. The mirror planes are the cyan great circles.

The regular icosahedron has the thirty-one axes of rotational symmetry (that is, rotating around an axis that results in an identical appearance). There are six axes passing through two opposite vertices, ten axes rotating a triangular face, and fifteen axes passing through any of its edges. Respectively, these axes are five-fold rotational symmetry (0°, 72°, 144°, 216°, and 288°), three-fold rotational symmetry (0°, 120°, and 240°), and two-fold rotational symmetry (0° and 180°). The regular icosahedron also has fifteen mirror planes that can be represented as great circles on a sphere; these divide the surface of a sphere into 120 fundamental domains, each of which is a right triangle; these are called Möbius triangles. Both reflections and rotational symmetries are the isometries—transformations in order to maintain the appearance—which forms the full icosahedral symmetry $\mathrm{I}_\mathrm{h}$ of order 120. This symmetry group is isomorphic to the product of the rotational symmetry group and the cyclic group of size two, generated by the reflection through the center of the regular icosahedron.

The rotational symmetry group of the regular icosahedron is isomorphic to the alternating group on five letters. This non-abelian simple group is the only non-trivial normal subgroup of the symmetric group on five letters. Since the Galois group of the general quintic equation is isomorphic to the symmetric group on five letters, and this normal subgroup is simple and non-abelian, the general quintic equation does not have a solution in radicals. The proof of the Abel–Ruffini theorem uses this simple fact, and Felix Klein wrote a book that made use of the theory of icosahedral symmetries to derive an analytical solution to the general quintic equation.

The regular icosahedron is isogonal, isohedral, and isotoxal: any two vertices, two faces, and two edges of a regular icosahedron can be transformed by rotations and reflections under its symmetry orbit, which preserves the appearance. Each regular polyhedron has a convex hull on its edge midpoints; icosidodecahedron is the convex hull of a regular icosahedron. Each vertex is surrounded by five equilateral triangles, so the regular icosahedron denotes $3.3.3.3.3$ in vertex configuration or $\{3,5\}$ in Schläfli symbol.

== Appearances ==
=== Toys ===
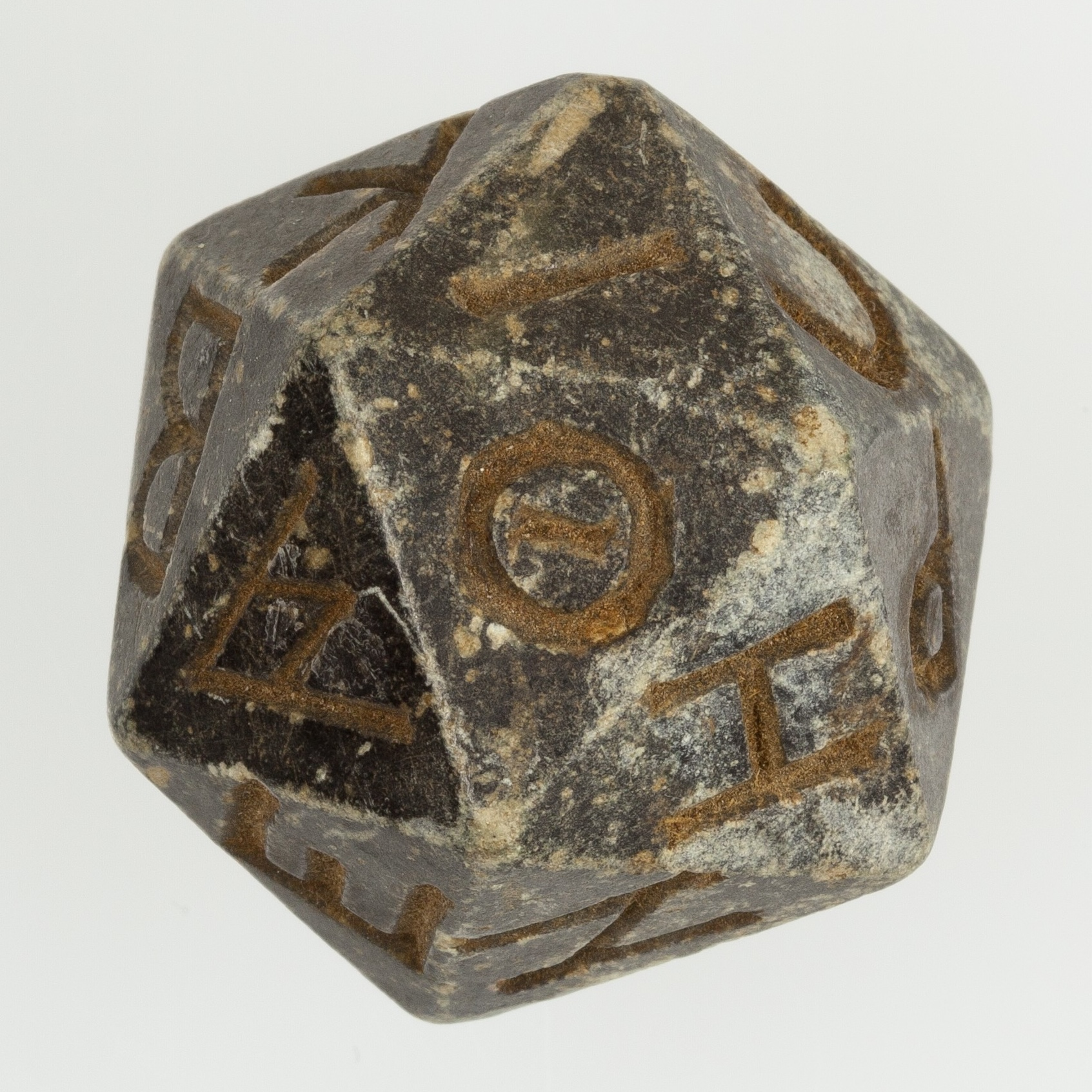
A twenty-sided die from Ptolemaic Egypt, inscribed with Greek letters on the faces

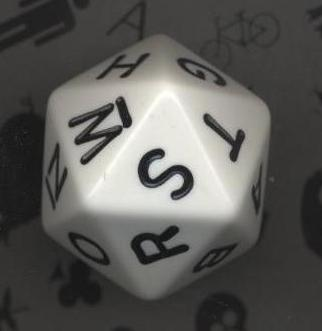
The Scattergories twenty-sided die, excluding the six letters Q, U, V, X, Y, and Z

Dice are among the most common objects that utilize different polyhedra, one of which is the regular icosahedron. The twenty-sided die was found in ancient times. One example is the die from Ptolemaic Egypt, which was later used with Greek letters inscribed on the faces in the period of Greece and Rome. Another example was found in the treasure of Tipu Sultan, which was made out of gold and with numbers written on each face.

In several roleplaying games, such as Dungeons & Dragons, the twenty-sided die (labeled as d20) is commonly used in determining success or failure of an action. It may be numbered from "0" to "9" twice, in which form it usually serves as a ten-sided die (d10); most modern versions are labeled from "1" to "20". Scattergories is another board game in which the player names the category entries on a card within a given set time. The naming of such categories is initially with the letters contained in every twenty-sided dice.

=== Natural forms and sciences ===
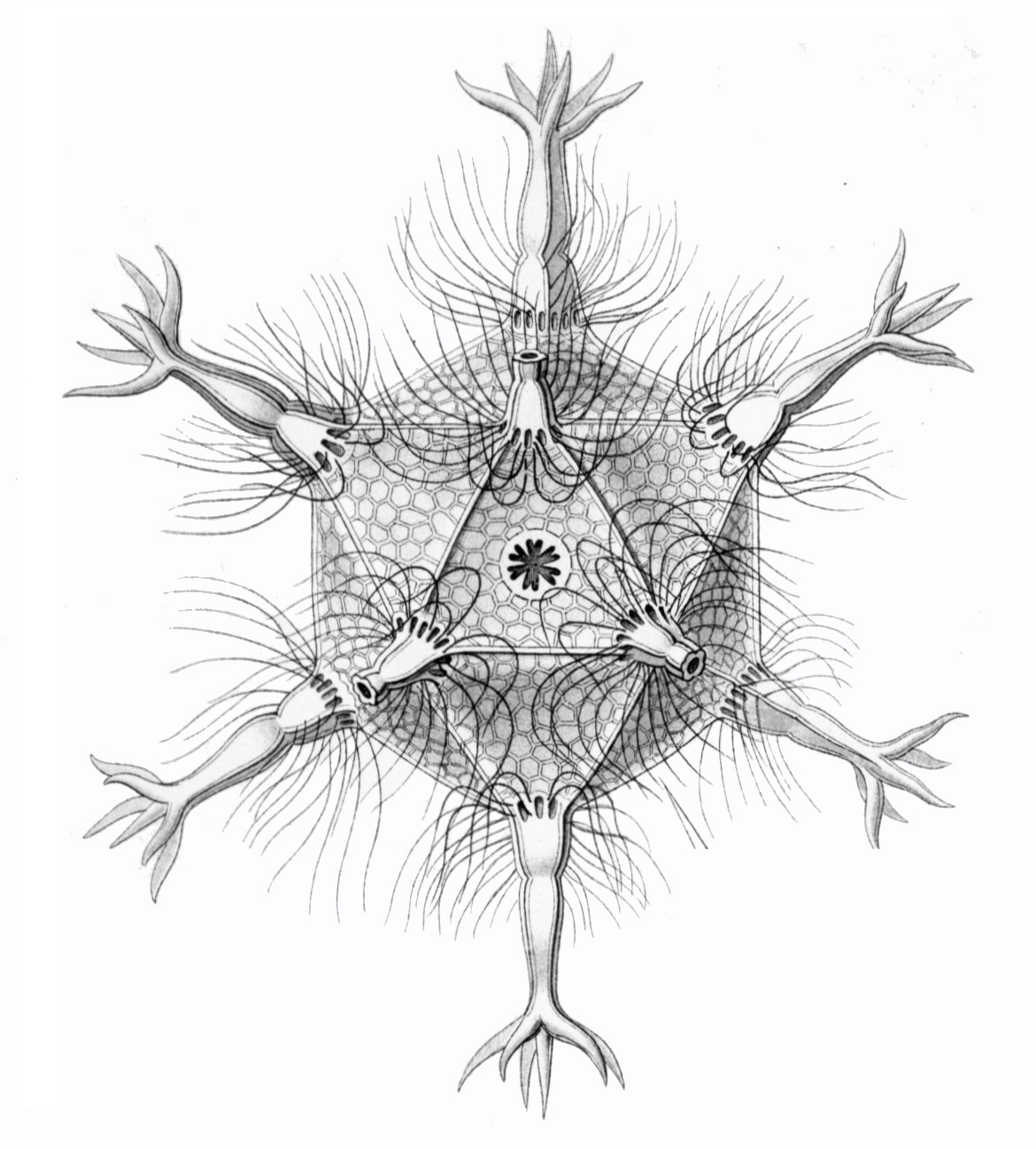
The radiolarian Circogonia icosahedra

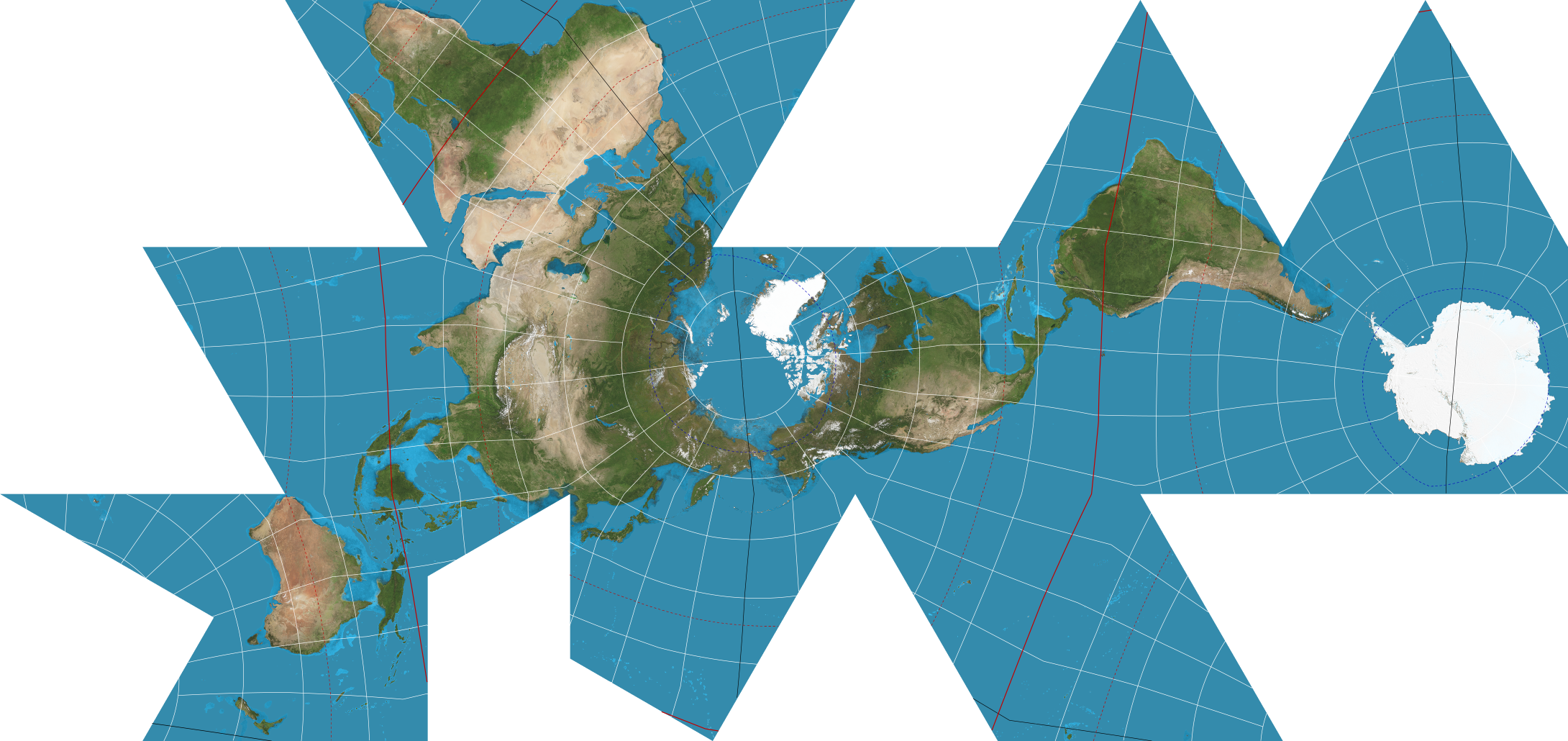
Dymaxion map, created by the net of a regular icosahedron

In virology, herpes virus have icosahedral shells, especially well-known in adenovirus. The outer protein shell of HIV is enclosed in a regular icosahedron, as is the head of a typical myovirus. Several species of radiolarians discovered by Ernst Haeckel, described their shells as like-shaped various regular polyhedra; one of which is Circogonia icosahedra, whose skeleton is shaped like a regular icosahedron.

In chemistry, the closo-carboranes are compounds with a shape resembling the regular icosahedron. The crystal twinning with icosahedral shapes also occurs in crystals, especially nanoparticles. Many borides and allotropes of boron such as α- and β-rhombohedral contain boron B_{12} icosahedron as a basic structure unit.

In cartography, R. Buckminster Fuller used the net of a regular icosahedron to create a map known as Dymaxion map, by subdividing the net into triangles, followed by calculating the grid on the Earth's surface, and transferring the results from the sphere to the polyhedron. This projection was created during the time that Fuller realized that Greenland is smaller than South America.

In the Thomson problem, concerning the minimum-energy configuration of $n$ charged particles on a sphere, and for the Tammes problem of constructing a spherical code maximizing the smallest distance among the points, the minimum solution known for $n = 12$ places the points at the vertices of a regular icosahedron, inscribed in a sphere. This configuration is proven optimal for the Tammes problem, and also for the Thomas problem.

In tensegrity, the regular icosahedron is composed of six struts and twenty-four cables that connect twelve nodes. One self-stress state is present within the combination achieved through the use of cellular morphogenesis.

=== Ancient texts ===
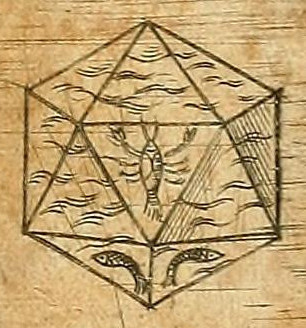
Sketch of a regular icosahedron by Johannes Kepler

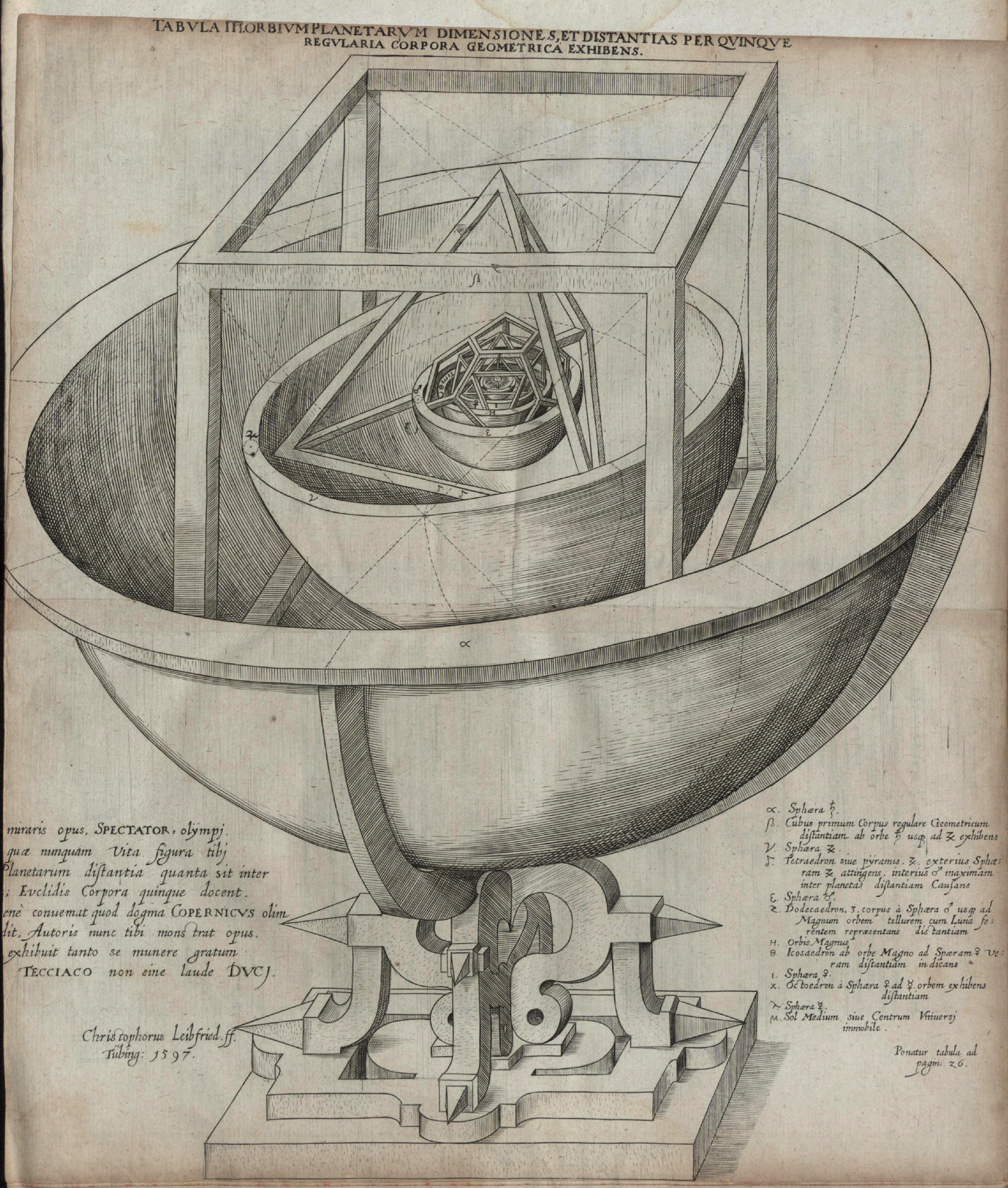
Kepler's Platonic solid model of the Solar System

The regular icosahedron is one of the five Platonic solids. The regular polyhedra have been known since antiquity, but are named after Plato who, in his Timaeus dialogue, identified these with the five elements, whose elementary units were attributed these shapes: fire (tetrahedron), air (octahedron), water (icosahedron), earth (cube) and the shape of the universe as a whole (dodecahedron). Euclid's Elements defined the Platonic solids and solved the problem of finding the ratio of the circumscribed sphere's diameter to the edge length.

Following their identification with the elements by Plato, Johannes Kepler in his Harmonices Mundi sketched each of them, in particular, the regular icosahedron. In his Mysterium Cosmographicum, he also proposed a model of the Solar System based on the placement of Platonic solids in a concentric sequence of increasing radius of the inscribed and circumscribed spheres whose radii gave the distance of the six known planets from the common center. The ordering of the solids, from innermost to outermost, consisted of: regular octahedron, regular icosahedron, regular dodecahedron, regular tetrahedron, and cube.

Illustrations by Leonardo da Vinci of both the regular icosahedron and the regular dodecahedron, among other polyhedra, are included in Luca Pacioli's Divina proportione.

== Representation ==
=== As a graph ===
Icosahedral graph

Every Platonic graph, including the icosahedral graph, is a polyhedral graph: they can be drawn in the plane without crossing its edges, and the removal of any two of its vertices leaves a connected subgraph. According to Steinitz's theorem, the icosahedral graph endowed with these heretofore properties represents the skeleton of a regular icosahedron.

The icosahedral graph has twelve vertices, the same number of vertices as a regular icosahedron. These vertices are connected by five edges from each vertex, making the icosahedral graph 5-regular. The icosahedral graph is Hamiltonian, because it has a cycle that can visit each vertex exactly once. Any subset of four vertices has three connected edges, with one being the central of all of those three, and the icosahedral graph has no induced subgraph, a claw-free graph.

The icosahedral graph is a graceful graph, meaning that each vertex can be labeled with an integer between 0 and 30 inclusive, in such a way that the absolute difference between the labels of an edge's two vertices is different for every edge.

=== As a configuration matrix ===
The regular icosahedron can be represented as a configuration matrix, a matrix in which the rows and columns correspond to the elements of a polyhedron as the vertices, edges, and faces. The diagonal of a matrix denotes the number of each element that appears in a polyhedron, whereas the non-diagonal of a matrix denotes the number of the column's elements that occur in or at the row's element. The following matrix is:
$$\begin{bmatrix}
12 & 5 & 5 \\
2 & 30 & 2 \\
3 & 3 & 20
\end{bmatrix}.$$

== Related figures ==
=== Inscribed in other Platonic solids ===
The regular icosahedron is the dual polyhedron of the regular dodecahedron. A regular icosahedron can be inscribed in a regular dodecahedron by placing its vertices at the face centers of the regular dodecahedron, and vice versa. The regular dodecahedron has icosahedral symmetry.

Apart from the construction above, the regular icosahedron can be inscribed in a regular octahedron by placing its twelve vertices on the twelve edges of the octahedron such that they divide each edge in the golden section. Because the resulting segments are unequal, there are five different ways to do this consistently, so five disjoint icosahedra can be inscribed in each octahedron. Another relation between the two is that they are part of the progressive transformation from the cuboctahedron's rigid struts and flexible vertices, known as jitterbug transformation.

A regular icosahedron of edge length $1/\varphi \approx 0.618$ can be inscribed in a unit-edge-length cube by placing six of its edges—three orthogonal opposite pairs—on the square faces of the cube, centered on the face centers and parallel or perpendicular to the square's edges. Because there are five times as many icosahedron edges as cube faces, there are five ways to do this consistently, so five disjoint icosahedra can be inscribed in each cube. The edge lengths of the cube and the inscribed icosahedron are in the golden ratio.

=== Stellations ===
The regular icosahedron has a large number of stellations, constructed by extending the faces of a regular icosahedron. Coxeter et al. (1938) in their work, The Fifty-Nine Icosahedra, identified fifty-nine stellations for the regular icosahedron. The regular icosahedron itself is the zeroth stellation of an icosahedron, and the first stellation has each original face augmented by a low pyramid. The final stellation includes all of the cells in the icosahedron's stellation diagram, meaning every three intersecting face planes of the icosahedral core intersect either on a vertex of this polyhedron or inside it.

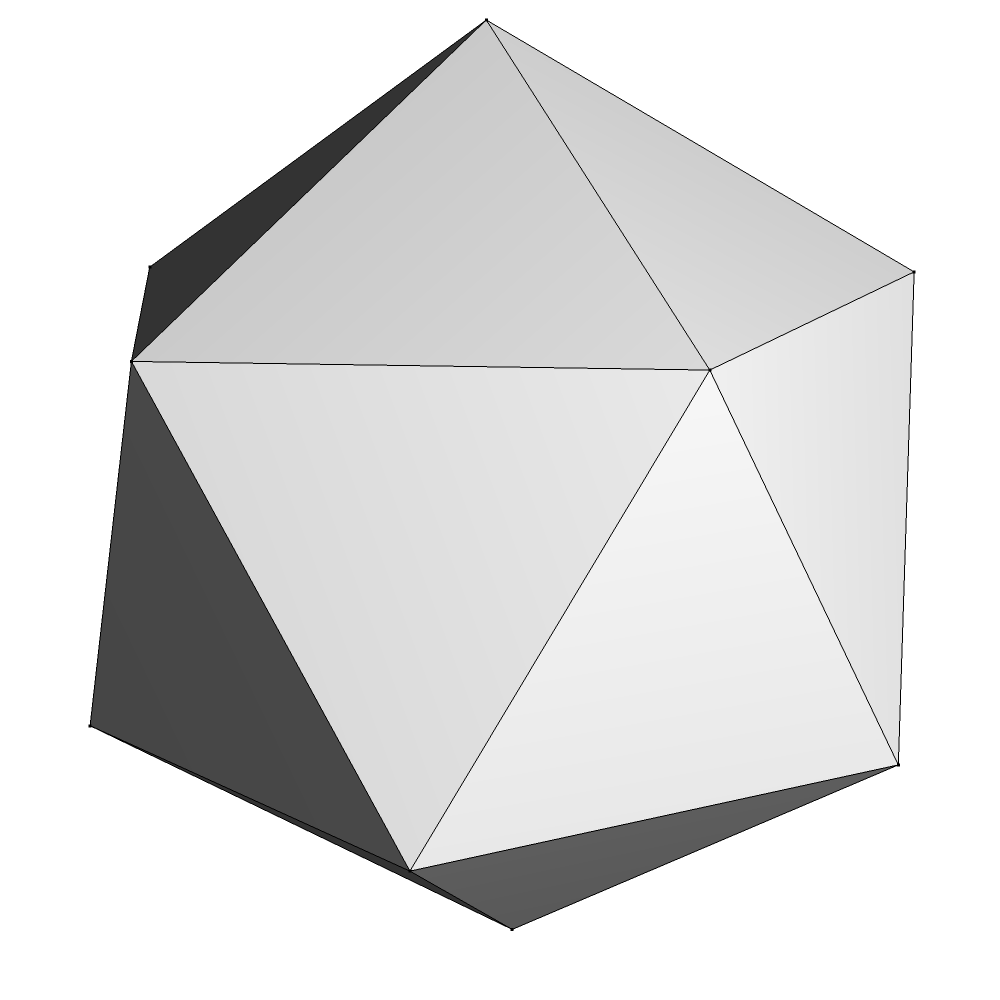
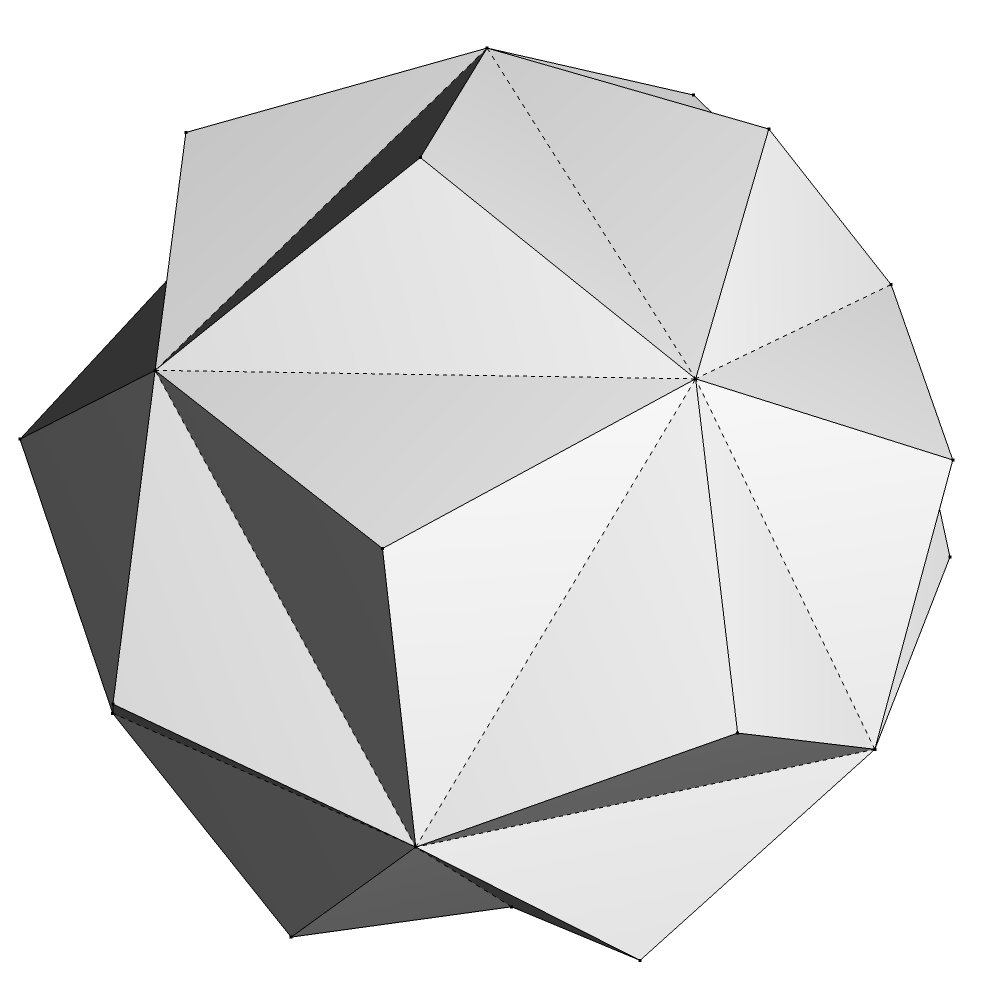
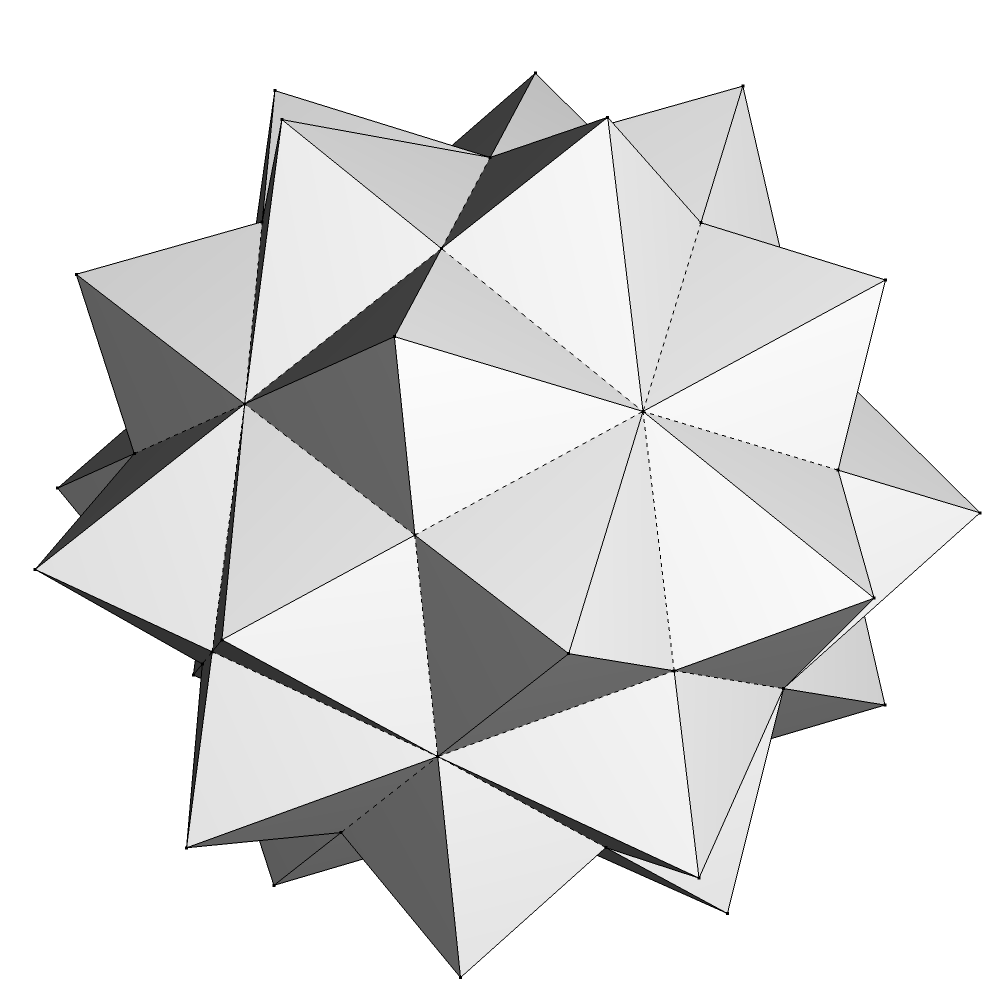
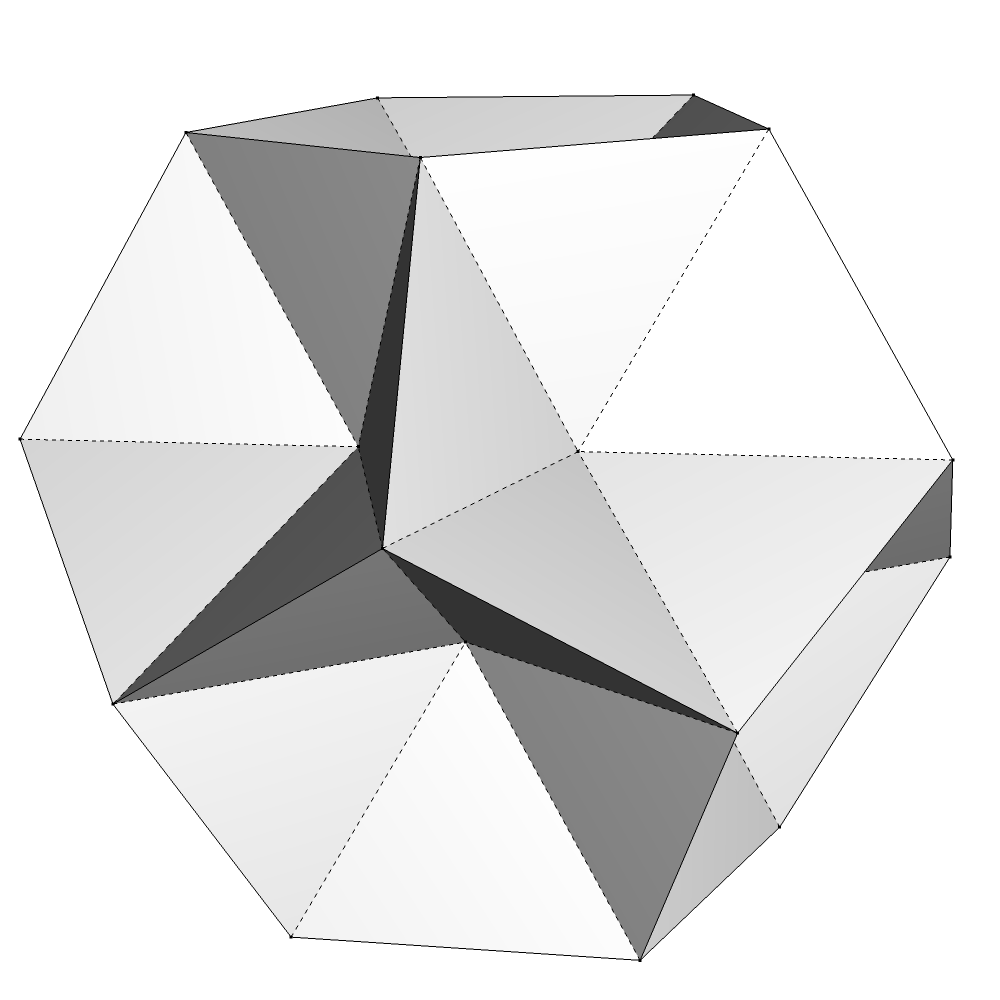
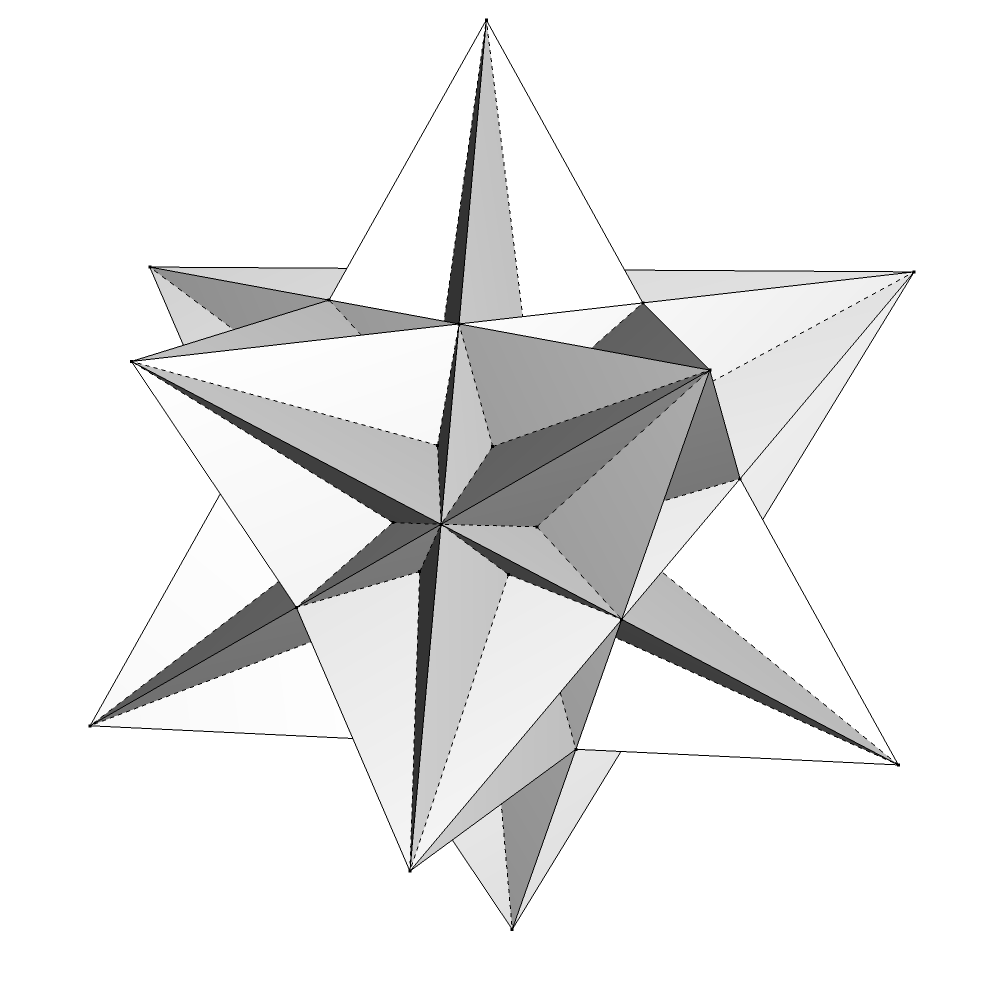
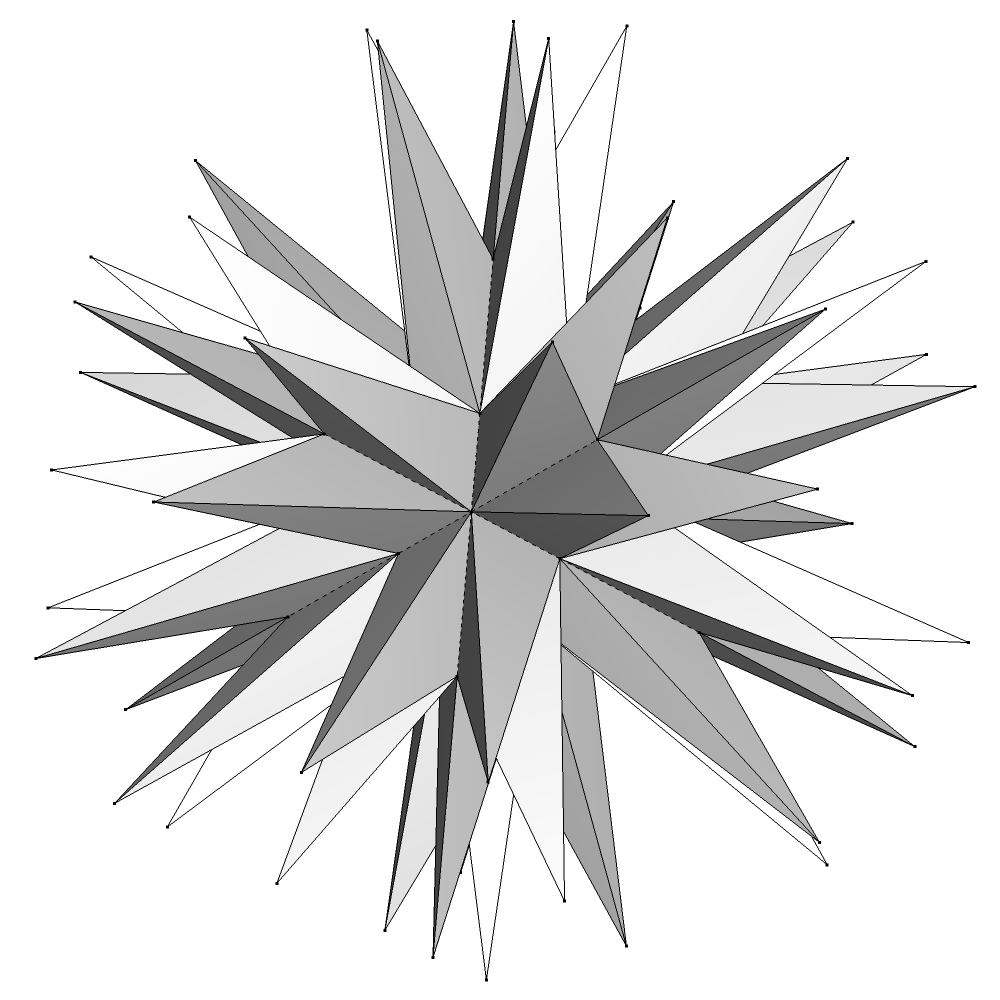
Six stellations of the regular icosahedron according to Coxeter et al. (1938): regular icosahedron (zeroth), the first stellation, regular compound of five octahedra, excavated dodecahedron, great icosahedron, and final stellation. See the list for more.

=== Faceting ===
The great dodecahedron can be constructed from the regular icosahedron in other ways. Aside from the stellation, the great dodecahedron can be constructed by faceting the regular icosahedron, that is, removing the triangle faces of the regular icosahedron without removing the vertices or creating a new one; then forming twelve regular pentagons on sets of five vertices inside of a regular icosahedron. These new faces intersect each other, making a pentagram as the vertex figure.

=== Other polyhedra construction ===
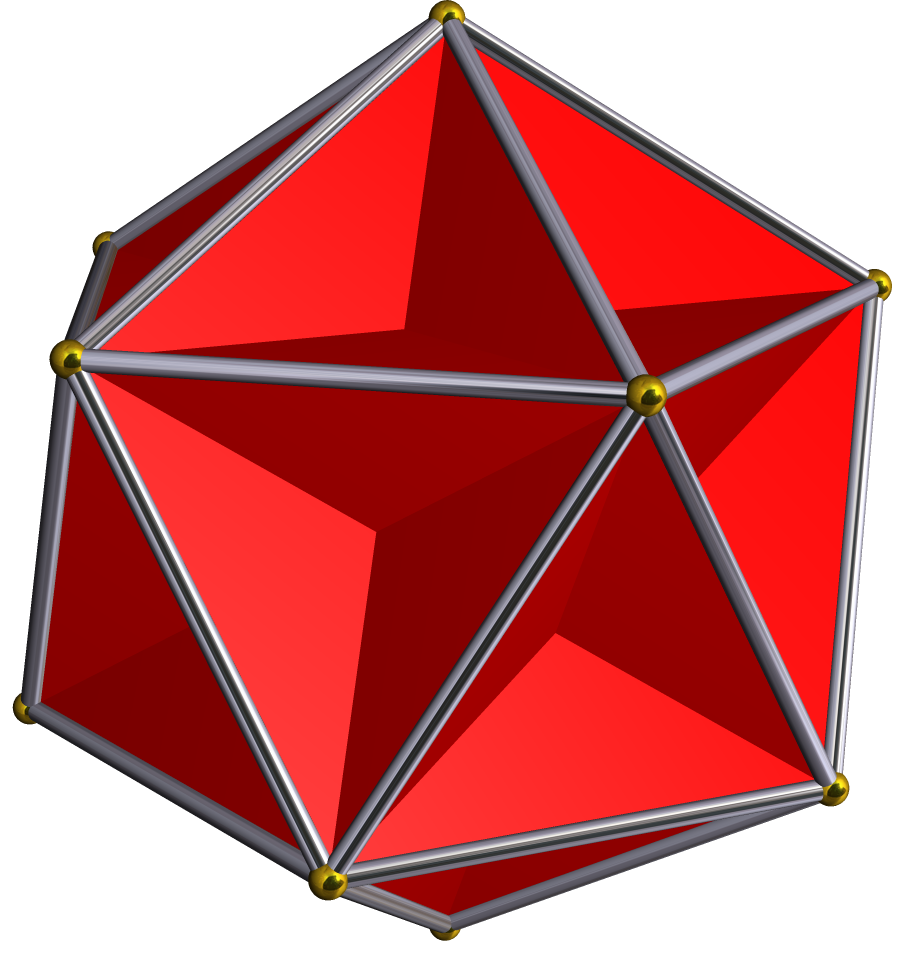
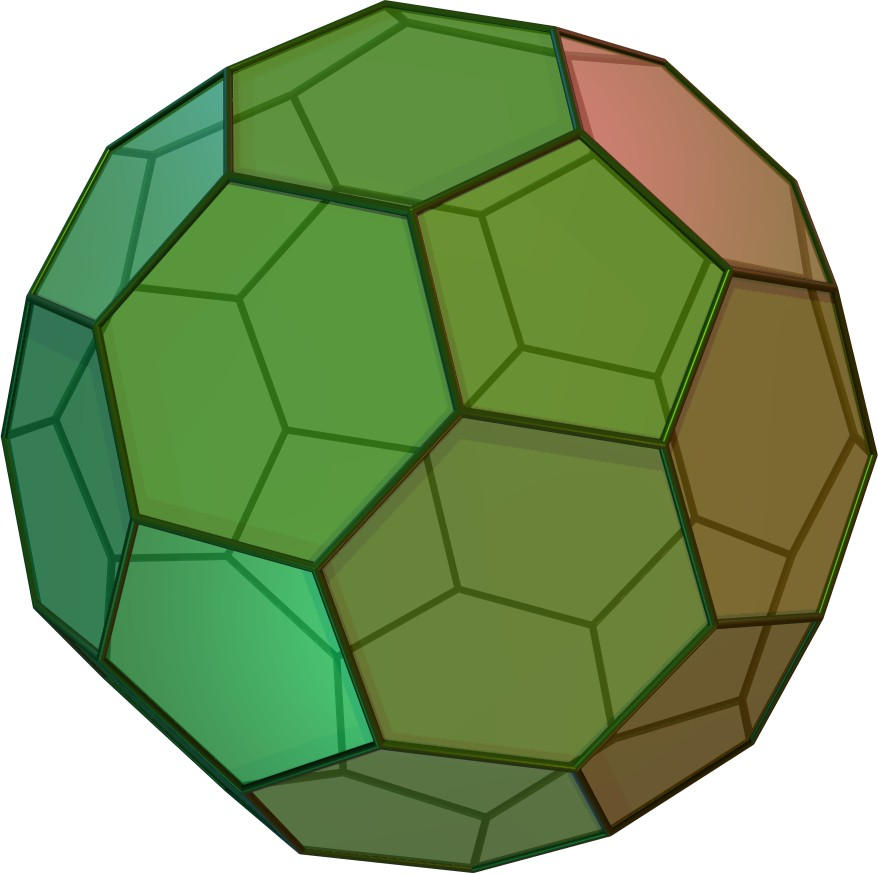
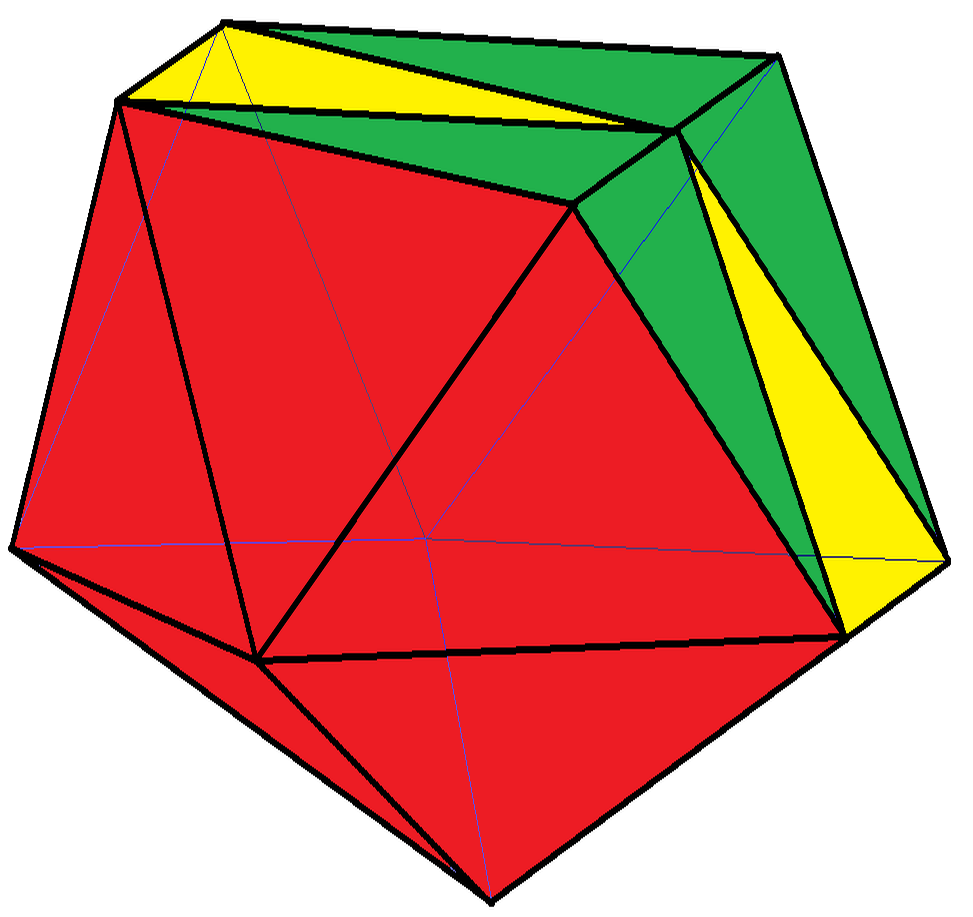
Top left to bottom right: great dodecahedron, truncated icosahedron, gyroelongated pentagonal pyramid, and edge-contracted icosahedron

The triakis icosahedron is a Catalan solid constructed by attaching the base of triangular pyramids onto each face of a regular icosahedron, the Kleetope of an icosahedron. The truncated icosahedron is an Archimedean solid constructed by truncating the vertices of a regular icosahedron; the resulting polyhedron may be considered as a football because of having a pattern of numerous hexagonal and pentagonal faces, or a structural form of carbon known as buckminsterfullerene that has 60 carbon atoms bonded together.

A Johnson solid is a polyhedron whose faces are all regular but which is not uniform. In other words, they do not include the Archimedean solids, the Catalan solids, the prisms, or the antiprisms. Some Johnson solids can be derived by removing part of a regular icosahedron, a process known as diminishment. They are gyroelongated pentagonal pyramid, metabidiminished icosahedron, and tridiminished icosahedron, which remove one, two, and three pentagonal pyramids from the icosahedron, respectively.

The edge-contracted icosahedron has a surface like a regular icosahedron but with some faces lie in the same plane.

=== Spherical icosahedron ===
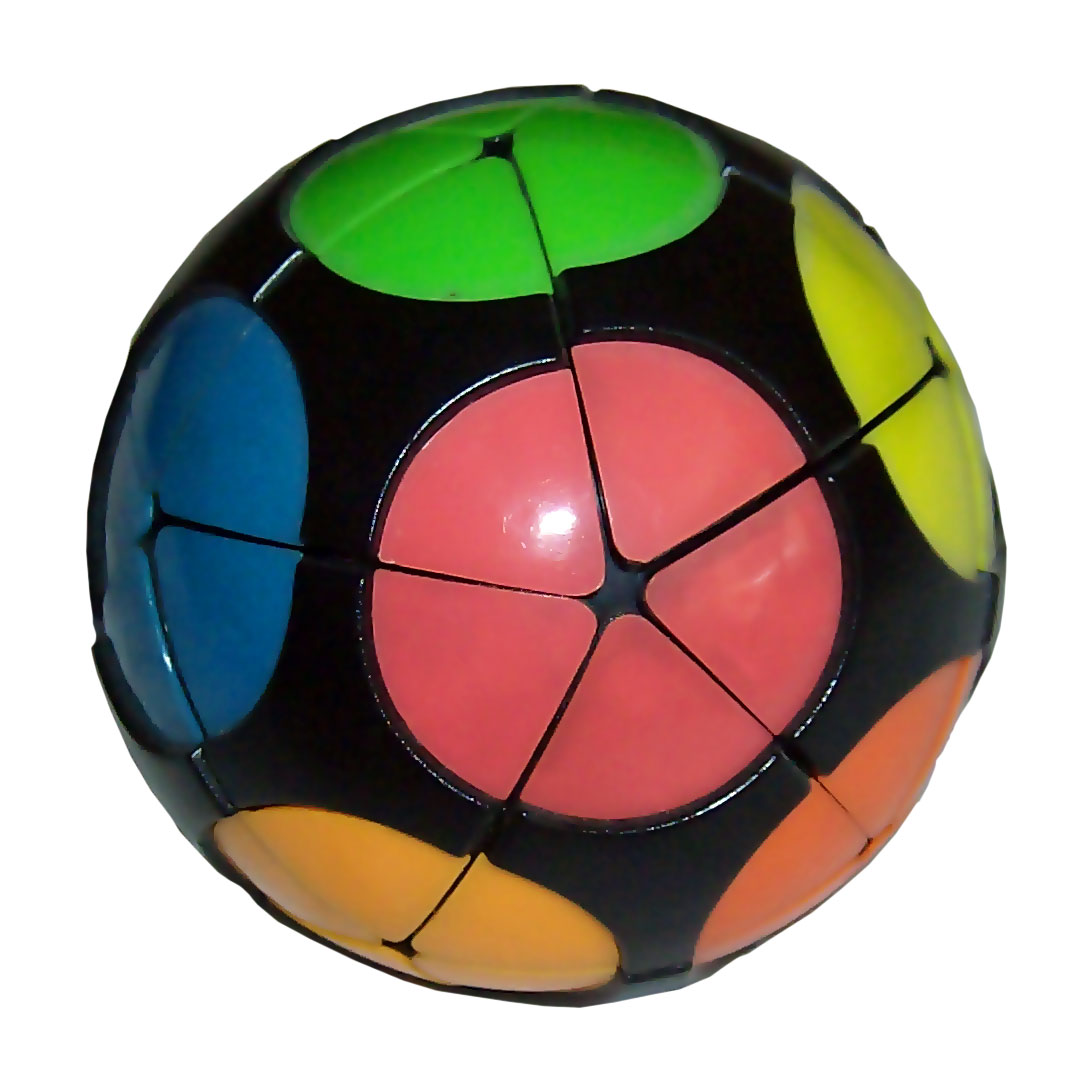
Spherical icosahedron and a toy named Impossiball

The spherical icosahedron represents a regular icosahedron projected to a sphere, a part of spherical polyhedron. It can be modeled by the arc of great circles, creating bounds as the edges of spherical triangle. Identified by R. Buckminster Fuller, there are 31 great circles in a spherical icosahedron. Its dual is the spherical dodecahedron. The appearance of this shape may be found in Impossiball, a similar toy to Rubik's Cube.

=== Miscellaneous ===
Regular icosahedron and its non-convex variant, which differs from Jessen's icosahedron in having different vertex positions and non-right-angled dihedrals

Another related shape can be derived by keeping the vertices of a regular icosahedron in their original positions and replacing certain pairs of equilateral triangles with pairs of isosceles triangles. The resulting polyhedron has the non-convex version of the regular icosahedron. Nonetheless, it is occasionally incorrectly known as Jessen's icosahedron because of the similar visual, of having the same combinatorial structure and symmetry as Jessen's icosahedron; (Note: Incorrect descriptions of Jessen's icosahedron as having the same vertex positions as a regular icosahedron include: Wells 1991, p. 161; Jessen's Orthogonal Icosahedron on MathWorld (old version, subsequently fixed).) the difference is that the non-convex one does not form a tensegrity structure and does not have right-angled dihedrals.

The regular icosahedron is analogous to the 600-cell, a regular 4-dimensional polytope. This polytope has six hundred regular tetrahedra as its cells. The regular icosahedron is a cell for the honeycomb in a hyperbolic three-dimensional space.

== See also ==
- Binary icosahedral group, a double cover of the group of rotations of the icosahedron
  - Icosian, a set of quaternions with the same symmetry
- Dehn invariant
- Disdyakis triacontahedron, a 120-sided convex polyhedron whose faces are the fundamental domains in icosahedral symmetry. Six such regions can be painted on each face of an icosahedron
- Dogic, an icosahedral version of Rubik's Cube
- Geodesic grid
- Geodesic polyhedron
- Goldberg polyhedron, a convex polyhedron made from hexagons and pentagons with icosahedral symmetry
- Hemi-icosahedron
- Polyhedral map projection, map projections taking the globe to a polyhedron
- Rhombic triacontahedron, a 30-sided convex polyhedron with icosahedral symmetry whose faces lie in the 2-fold symmetry planes
- Tensegrity icosahedron
- Tetrahedral-icosahedral honeycomb, another hyperbolic honeycomb involving some icosahedral cells
- Zometool, a construction toy based on the icosahedral symmetry system

Fundamental convex regular and uniform polytopes
Family	A_{n}	B_{n}	I_{2}(p) / D_{n}	E_{6} / E_{7} / E_{8} / F_{4} / G_{2}	H_{n}
Regular polygon	Triangle	Square	p-gon	Hexagon	Pentagon
Uniform polyhedron	Tetrahedron	Octahedron • Cube	Demicube		Dodecahedron • Icosahedron
Uniform polychoron	Pentachoron	16-cell • Tesseract	Demitesseract	24-cell	120-cell • 600-cell
Uniform 5-polytope	5-simplex	5-orthoplex • 5-cube	5-demicube		
Uniform 6-polytope	6-simplex	6-orthoplex • 6-cube	6-demicube	1_{22} • 2_{21}	
Uniform 7-polytope	7-simplex	7-orthoplex • 7-cube	7-demicube	1_{32} • 2_{31} • 3_{21}	
Uniform 8-polytope	8-simplex	8-orthoplex • 8-cube	8-demicube	1_{42} • 2_{41} • 4_{21}	
Uniform n-polytope	n-simplex	n-orthoplex • n-cube	n-demicube	1_{k2} • 2_{k1} • k_{21}	n-pentagonal polytope
Topics: Polytope families • Regular polytope • List of regular polytopes and compounds • Polytope operations

Notable stellations of the icosahedron
Regular	Regular star	Uniform duals		
(Convex) icosahedron	Great icosahedron	Small triambic icosahedron	Medial triambic icosahedron	Great triambic icosahedron
Regular compounds			Others	
Compound of five octahedra	Compound of five tetrahedra	Compound of ten tetrahedra	Excavated dodecahedron	Final stellation
