= Erich Schönhardt =

German mathematician (1891–1979)

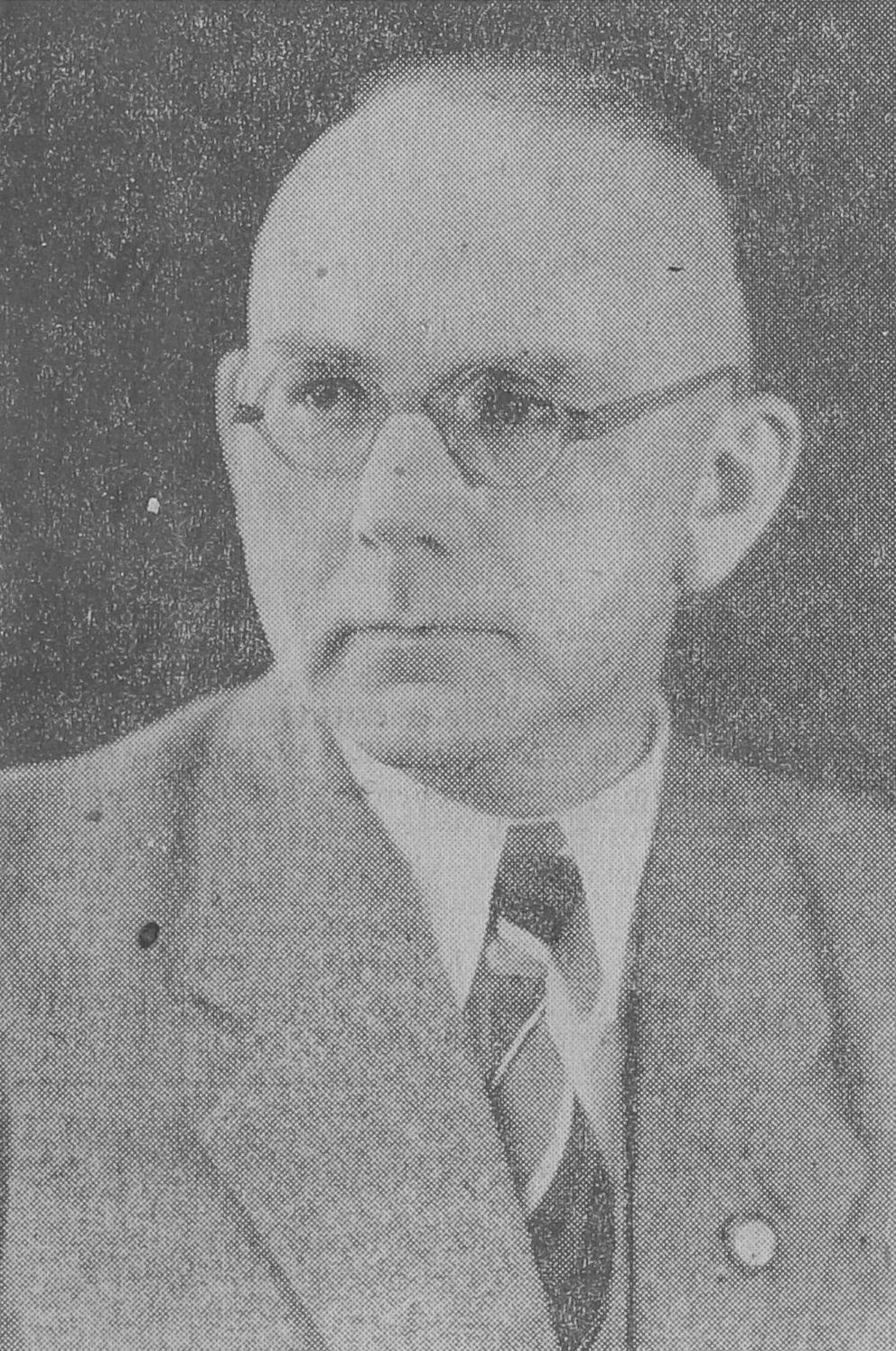
Image of Erich Schönhardt

Erich Schönhardt (25 June 1891 – 29 November 1979) was a German mathematician known for his 1928 discovery of the Schönhardt polyhedron, a non-convex polyhedron that cannot be partitioned into tetrahedra without introducing additional vertices.

Schönhardt studied at the University of Stuttgart, and went on to do his graduate studies at the University of Tübingen, receiving his Ph.D. in 1920 for a thesis on Schottky groups under the supervision of Ludwig Maurer. In the 1930s, he was the Dozentenführer (Nazi political leader of the faculty) at Tübingen, and was responsible for denouncing fellow Tübingen mathematician Erich Kamke for having married a Jewish woman. He moved back to the University of Stuttgart in 1936 and was rector there from 1939 to 1942. He was a permanent editor of the journal Deutsche Mathematik.
