= Journal of Geometry =

Mathematics journal

- Discipline: Geometry
- Language: English
- Edited by: Hans Havlicek, Alexander Kreuzer

Publication details
- History: 1971-present
- Publisher: Birkhäuser
- Frequency: Triannual
- Open access: Hybrid

Standard abbreviations
- ISO 4: J. Geom.

Indexing
- ISSN: 0047-2468 (print); 1420-8997 (web)
- LCCN: 73644592
- OCLC no.: 1787475

Links
- Journal homepage; Online archive

The Journal of Geometry is a triannual peer-reviewed scientific journal covering geometry, broadly considered. In particular this includes "foundations of geometry, geometric algebra, finite geometries, combinatorial geometry, and special geometries". It was established in 1971 by Walter Benz and is published by Birkhäuser. The editors-in-chief are Hans Havlicek (Technische Universität Wien) and Alexander Kreuzer (Universität Hamburg).

== Abstracting and indexing ==
The journal is abstracted and indexed in EBSCO databases, Emerging Sources Citation Index, Scopus, and zbMATH Open.
