= 1897 in science =

The year 1897 in science and technology involved some significant events, listed below.

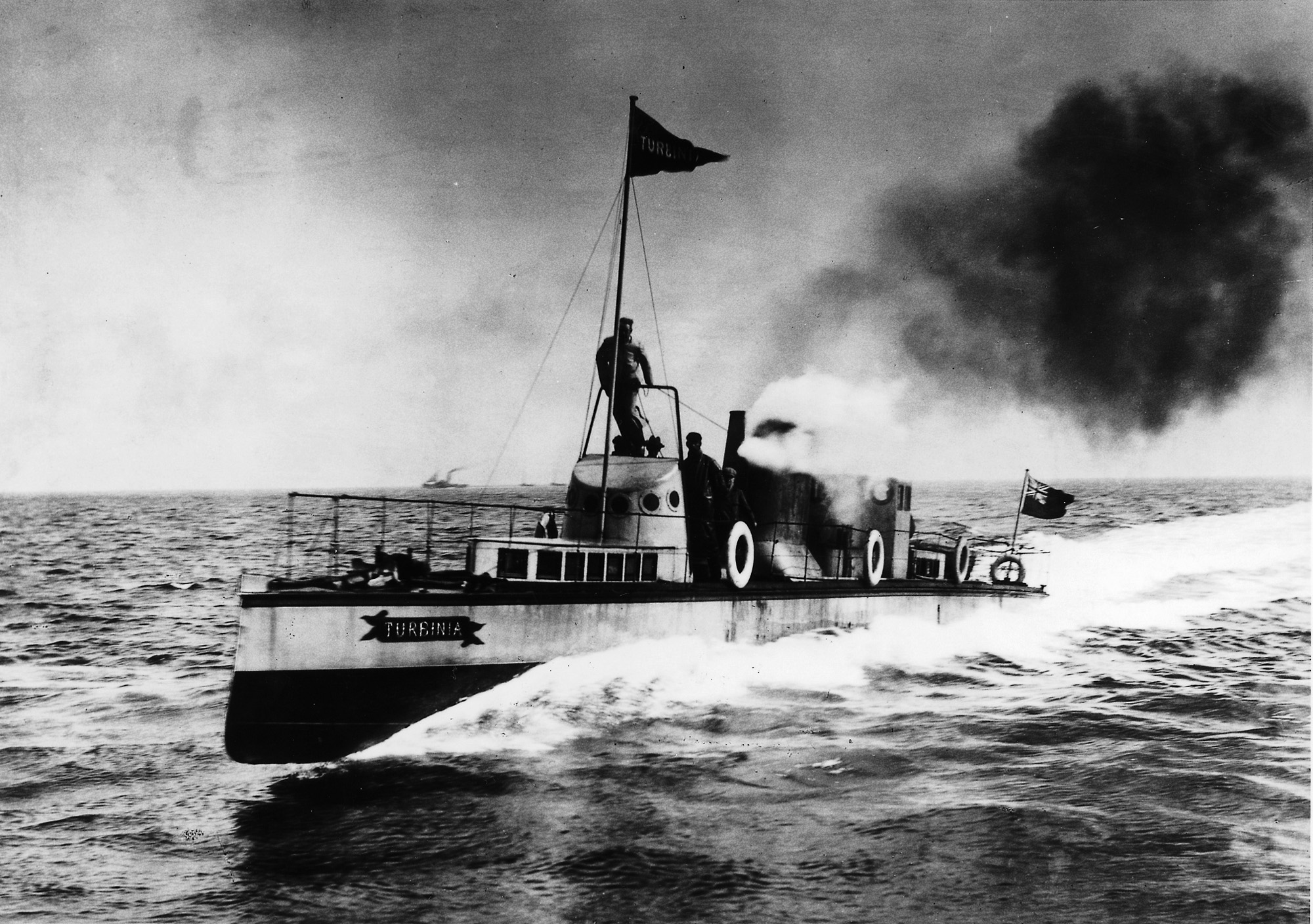
Turbinia photographed by Alfred J. West

== Chemistry ==
- April 30 – J. J. Thomson first describes his discovery of the electron, in England.

== Earth sciences ==
- June 12 – 1897 Assam earthquake of magnitude of 8.0 rocks Assam, India, killing over 1,500 people.

== History of science and technology ==
- Adolf Erik Nordenskiöld publishes Periplus: An Essay on the Early History of Charts and Sailing Directions in Stockholm.
- Boulton and Watt's Smethwick Engine of 1779 (superseded 1892) is dismantled for preservation by the Birmingham Canal Navigations company, initially at its Ocker Hill depot in the West Midlands of England.

== Mathematics ==
- David Hilbert unifies the field of algebraic number theory with his treatise Zahlbericht.
- John Edward Campbell originates the Baker–Campbell–Hausdorff formula for multiplication of exponentials in Lie algebras.
- Raoul Bricard investigates and classifies flexible polyhedra, defining the Bricard octahedron.
- Henri Brocard begins publication of his source book on geometric curves, Notes de Bibliographie des Courbes Géométriques, in Bar-le-Duc.
- Felix Bernstein, Ernst Schröder and (for a second time) Richard Dedekind independently discover proofs of the Schröder–Bernstein theorem in set theory.

== Physiology, medicine and pharmacology ==
- May 6 – John Jacob Abel announces the successful isolation of epinephrine (adrenaline) in a paper read before the Association of American Physicians.
- August 10 – History of aspirin: At the German Bayer chemical and dyestuffs company, pharmacist Felix Hoffmann successfully synthesizes acetylsalicylic acid, a synthetically altered version of salicin, as a less-irritating replacement for standard common salicylate medicines, after isolating a compound from a plant of the Spiraea family; the company markets it under the brand name 'Aspirin'.
- August 20 – Ronald Ross discovers the malaria Plasmodium in an Anopheles mosquito, demonstrating the transmission mechanism for the disease.
- Danish veterinarian Bernhard Bang isolates Brucella abortus as the agent of Brucellosis.
- L. Emmett Holt publishes the standard textbook The Diseases of Infancy and Childhood in New York.
- Charles Sherrington introduces the term 'synapse'.

== Psychology ==
- Émile Durkheim publishes his classic study Le Suicide.

== Technology ==
- January 22 – The word computer is first used to refer to a mechanical calculation device, in this date's issue of the journal Engineering.
- May 11 – A patent is awarded for the invention of the first automotive muffler, with the granting by the U.S. Patent Office of application number 582,485 to Milton Reeves and his brother Marshall T. Reeves, of the Reeves Pulley Company of Columbus, Indiana.
- May 13 – Guglielmo Marconi sends the first ever wireless communication over open sea when the message "Are you ready" is transmitted across the Bristol Channel from Lavernock Point in South Wales to Flat Holm Island, a distance of 6 kilometres (3.7 mi).
- May 17 – Launch of the Holland VI (later USS Holland (SS-1)), designed by John Philip Holland, at Lewis Nixon's Crescent Shipyard in Elizabeth, New Jersey; this is the first submarine having power to run submerged for any considerable distance, and the first to combine electric motors for submerged travel and gasoline (Otto) engines for use on the surface.
- June 26 – At the British Fleet Review, Charles Parsons gives a spectacular display of the unprecedented speed attainable by his steam turbine-powered Turbinia.
- August 10 – Rudolf Diesel demonstrates his first commercially successful Diesel engine in Augsburg.
- August 31 – Thomas Edison is granted a patent for the Kinetoscope, a precursor of the movie projector.
- Hiram P. Maxim develops the muffler in conjunction with the firearm silencer (suppressor).
- The Dahlander pole changing motor is patented.
- The Daimler Victoria, the world's first meter-equipped (and gasoline-powered) taxicab, is built by Gottlieb Daimler.

== Awards ==
- Copley Medal: Albert von Kölliker
- Wollaston Medal: Wilfred Hudleston

== Births ==
- January 1 – Ana Aslan (died 1988), Romanian biologist.
- February 27 – Bernard Lyot (died 1952), French astronomer.
- March 24 – Wilhelm Reich (died 1957), Austrian psychoanalyst.
- May 16 – Zvi Sliternik (died 1993), Israeli entomologist.
- July 20 – Tadeusz Reichstein (died 1996), Polish-born Nobel Prize-winning chemist.
- August 5 – Joan Beauchamp Procter (died 1931), English herpetologist.
- August 12 – Otto Struve (died 1963), Ukrainian-born astronomer.
- October 6 – Florence B. Seibert (died 1991), American biochemist.
- September 1 – Mary Cover Jones (died 1987), American behavioral therapist.
- September 12 – Irène Joliot-Curie (died 1956), French chemist.
- November 4 – C. B. van Niel (died 1985), Dutch-born microbiologist.
- November 13 – Tilly Edinger (died 1967), German-born paleoneurologist.
- December 22 – Vojtěch Jarník (died 1970), Czech mathematician.

== Deaths ==
- January 25 – David Kirkaldy (born 1820), Scottish-born engineer, pioneer of materials testing.
- February 7 – Galileo Ferraris, Italian physicist and engineer (born 1847)
- February 19 – Karl Weierstrass (born 1815), German mathematician.
- March 15 – James Joseph Sylvester (born 1814), English mathematician.
- April 12 – Edward Drinker Cope (born 1840), American paleontologist.
- May 6
  - Edward James Stone (born 1831), English astronomer.
  - Alfred Des Cloizeaux (born 1817), French mineralogist.
- May 7 – Abraham Dee Bartlett (born 1812), English zoologist.
- August 27 – Eduard von Hofmann (born 1837), Austrian forensic pathologist.
- October 19 – George Pullman (born 1831), American inventor.
- October 31 – Samuel Haughton (born 1821), Irish scientific polymath.
- November 1 – Peter Bellinger Brodie (born 1815), English geologist and clergyman.
- November 14 – Thomas W. Evans (born 1823), American-born dentist.
