= Steffen's polyhedron =

Flexible polyhedron with 14 triangle faces

- Type: Flexible polyhedron
- Faces: 14 triangles
- Edges: 21
- Vertices: 9

Net
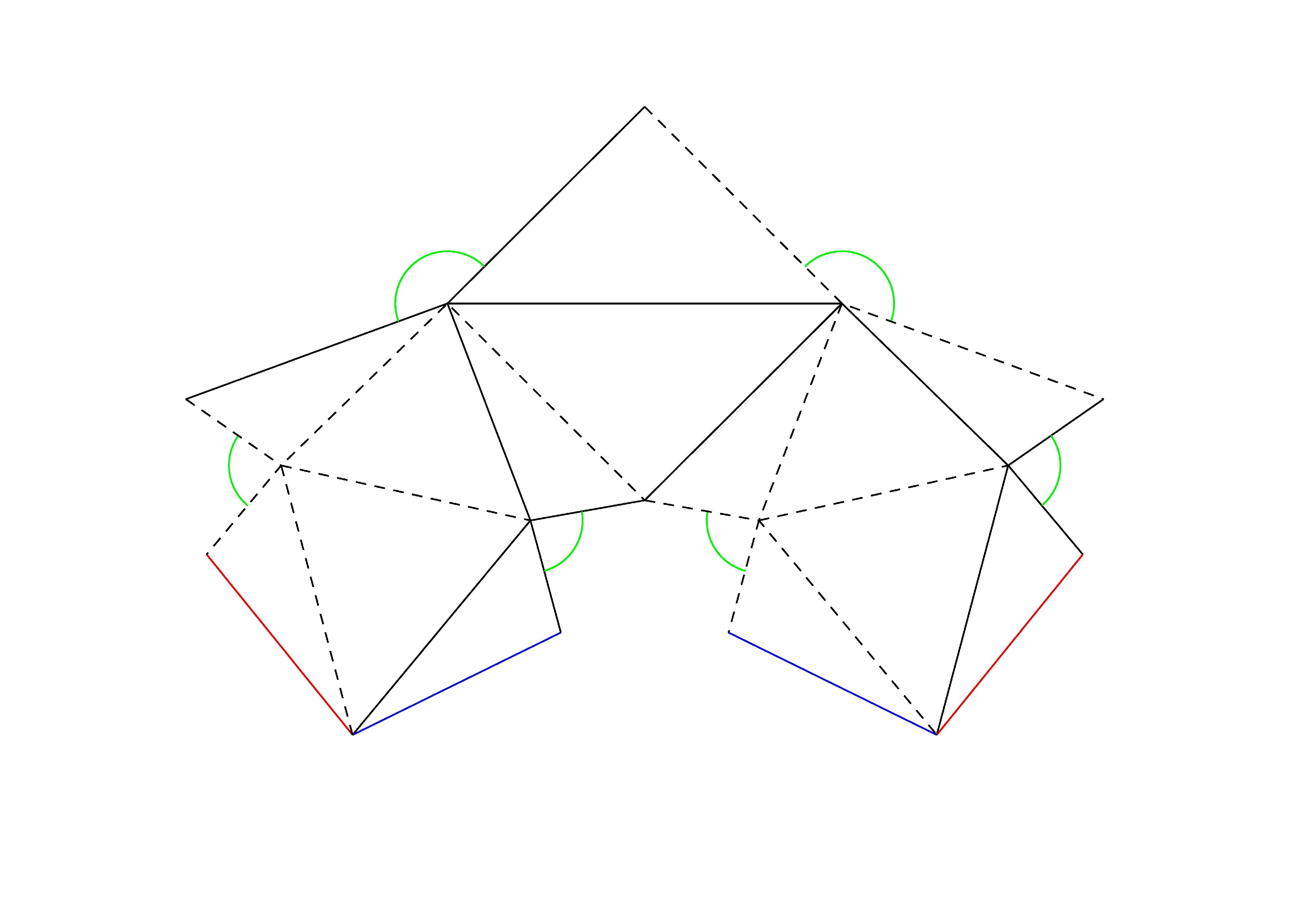
- A net for Steffen's polyhedron. The solid and dashed lines represent mountain folds and valley folds, respectively.

In geometry, Steffen's polyhedron is a flexible polyhedron discovered (in 1978) by and named after Klaus Steffen. It is based on the Bricard octahedron, but unlike the Bricard octahedron its surface does not cross itself. It has nine vertices, 21 edges, and 14 triangular faces. Its faces can be decomposed into three subsets: two six-triangle-patches from a Bricard octahedron, and two more triangles (the central two triangles of the net shown in the illustration) that link these patches together.

It obeys the strong bellows conjecture, meaning that (like the Bricard octahedron on which it is based) its Dehn invariant stays constant as it flexes.

Although it has been claimed to be the simplest possible flexible polyhedron without self-crossings, a 2024 preprint by Gallet et al. claims to construct a simpler non-self-crossing flexible polyhedron with only eight vertices.

Exact 2D net of Steffen's flexible polyhedron with coordinates and parameters from Alexandrov & Volokitin (2025).

Interactive 3D model of Steffen's polyhedron (canonical edge lengths: 17, 12, 10.627, 10, 5). Click to rotate and inspect geometry.

== Further references ==
- Alexandrov, Victor; Volokitin, Evgenii Volokitin (2025), Steffen's flexible polyhedron is embedded. A proof via symbolic computations, arXiv:2508.02392
