= Cauchy's theorem (geometry) =

Rigidity theorem for convex polyhedra

Cauchy's theorem is a theorem in geometry, named after Augustin Cauchy. It states that convex polytopes in three dimensions with congruent corresponding faces must be congruent to each other. That is, any polyhedral net formed by unfolding the faces of the polyhedron onto a flat surface, together with gluing instructions describing which faces should be connected to each other, uniquely determines the shape of the original polyhedron. For instance, if six squares are connected in the pattern of a cube, then they must form a cube: there is no convex polyhedron with six square faces connected in the same way that does not have the same shape.

This is a fundamental result in rigidity theory: one consequence of the theorem is that, if one makes a physical model of a convex polyhedron by connecting together rigid plates for each of the polyhedron faces with flexible hinges along the polyhedron edges, then this ensemble of plates and hinges will necessarily form a rigid structure.

== Statement ==
Convex regular icosahedron

Let P and Q be combinatorially equivalent 3-dimensional convex polytopes; that is, they are convex polytopes with isomorphic face lattices. Suppose further that each pair of corresponding faces from P and Q are congruent to each other, i.e. equal up to a rigid motion. Then P and Q are themselves congruent.

To see that convexity is necessary, consider a regular icosahedron. One can "push in" a vertex to create a nonconvex polyhedron that is still combinatorially equivalent to the regular icosahedron; that is, one can take five faces of the icosahedron meeting at a vertex, which form the sides of a pentagonal pyramid, and reflect the pyramid with respect to its base.

== History ==
The result originated in Euclid's Elements, where solids are called equal if the same holds for their faces. This version of the result was proved by Cauchy in 1813 based on earlier work by Lagrange. An error in Cauchy's proof of the main lemma was corrected by Ernst Steinitz, Isaac Jacob Schoenberg, and Aleksandr Danilovich Aleksandrov. The corrected proof of Cauchy is so short and elegant, that it is considered to be one of the Proofs from THE BOOK.

== Generalizations and related results ==
- The result does not hold on a plane or for non-convex polyhedra in $\mathbb R^3$: there exist non-convex flexible polyhedra that have one or more degrees of freedom of movement that preserve the shapes of their faces. In particular, the Bricard octahedra are self-intersecting flexible surfaces discovered by a French mathematician Raoul Bricard in 1897. The Connelly sphere, a flexible non-convex polyhedron homeomorphic to a 2-sphere, was discovered by Robert Connelly in 1977.
- Although originally proven by Cauchy in three dimensions, the theorem was extended to dimensions higher than 3 by Alexandrov (1950).
- Cauchy's rigidity theorem is a corollary from Cauchy's theorem stating that a convex polytope cannot be deformed so that its faces remain rigid.
- In 1974, Herman Gluck showed that in a certain precise sense almost all simply connected closed surfaces are rigid.
- Dehn's rigidity theorem is an extension of the Cauchy rigidity theorem to infinitesimal rigidity. This result was obtained by Dehn in 1916.
- The 1950 Alexandrov's theorem generalizing Cauchy's theorem by showing that convex polyhedra are uniquely described by the metric spaces of geodesics on their surface. The analogous uniqueness theorem for smooth surfaces was proved by Cohn-Vossen in 1927. Pogorelov's uniqueness theorem is a result by Pogorelov generalizing both of these results and applying to general convex surfaces.

== See also ==
- Schönhardt polyhedron
