= Octahedron =

Polyhedron with eight triangular faces

In geometry, an octahedron (pl.: octahedra or octahedrons) is any polyhedron with eight faces. One special case is the regular octahedron, a Platonic solid composed of eight equilateral triangles, four of which meet at each vertex. Many types of irregular octahedra also exist, including both convex and non-convex shapes.

== Regular octahedron ==
A regular octahedron

The regular octahedron has eight equilateral triangle sides, six vertices at which four sides meet, and twelve edges. Its dual polyhedron is a cube. It can be formed as the convex hull of the six axis-parallel unit vectors in three-dimensional Euclidean space. It is one of the five Platonic solids, and the three-dimensional case of an infinite family of regular polytopes, the cross polytopes. Although it does not tile space by itself, it can tile space together with the regular tetrahedron to form the tetrahedral-octahedral honeycomb.

== Combinatorially equivalent to the regular octahedron ==
Bricard octahedron with an antiparallelogram as its equator. The axis of symmetry passes through the plane of the antiparallelogram.

The following polyhedra are combinatorially equivalent to the regular octahedron. They all have six vertices, eight triangular faces, and twelve edges that correspond one-for-one with the features of it:

- Triangular antiprisms: Two faces are equilateral, lie on parallel planes, and have a common axis of symmetry. The other six triangles are isosceles. The regular octahedron is a special case in which the six lateral triangles are also equilateral.
- Tetragonal bipyramids, in which at least one of the equatorial quadrilaterals lies on a plane. The regular octahedron is a special case in which all three quadrilaterals are planar squares.
- Schönhardt polyhedron, a non-convex polyhedron that cannot be partitioned into tetrahedra without introducing new vertices.
- Bricard octahedron, a non-convex self-crossing flexible polyhedron.

== Other convex polyhedra ==
The regular octahedron has 6 vertices and 12 edges, the minimum for an octahedron; irregular octahedra may have as many as 12 vertices and 18 edges. There are 257 topologically distinct convex octahedra, excluding mirror images. More specifically there are 2, 11, 42, 74, 76, 38, 14 for octahedra with 6 to 12 vertices respectively. Two polyhedra are topologically distinct if they have intrinsically different arrangements of faces and vertices, such that it is impossible to distort one into the other simply by changing the lengths of edges or the angles between edges or faces.

Notable eight-sided convex polyhedra include:

Hexagonal prism: Two faces are parallel regular hexagons; six squares link corresponding pairs of hexagon edges. With all faces regular and all vertices symmetric to each other, this is a uniform polyhedron. It tiles space by translation as a parallelohedron. The hexagonal frustum is topologically equivalent.

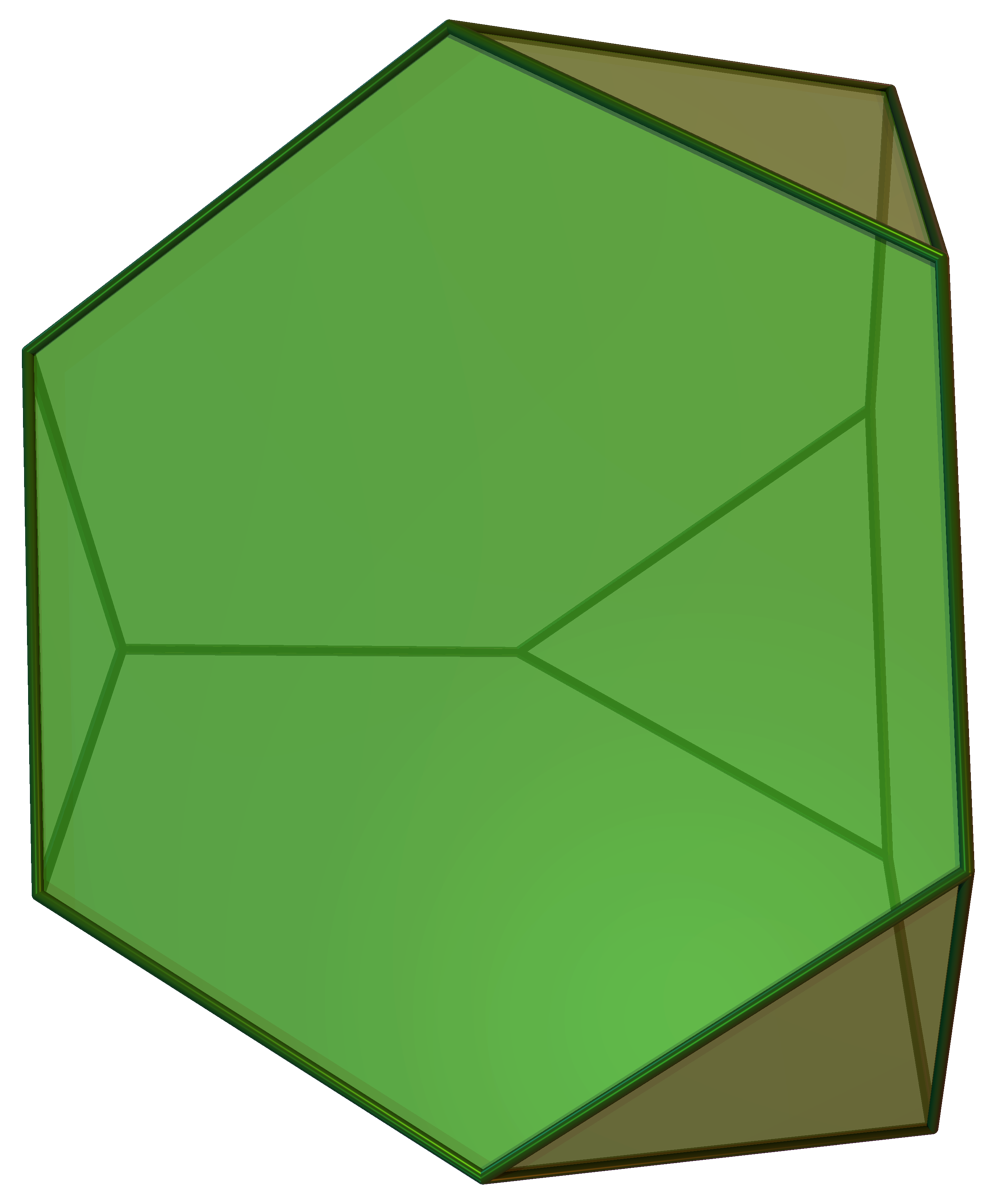
Truncated tetrahedron: The four faces from the tetrahedron are truncated to become regular hexagons, and there are four more equilateral triangle faces where each tetrahedron vertex was truncated. As a uniform polyhedron that is not a prism or antiprism, this is an Archimedean solid.

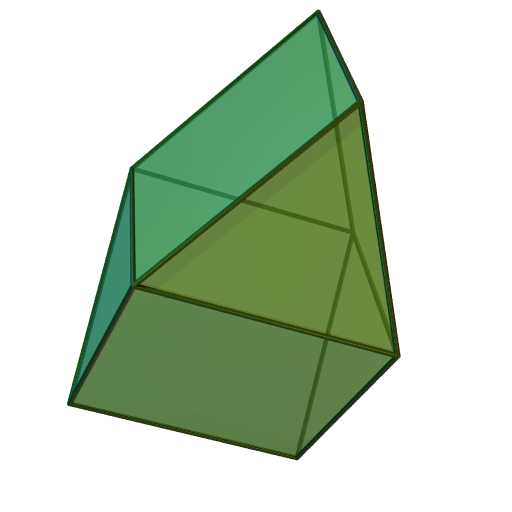
Gyrobifastigium: Two uniform triangular prisms glued over one of their square sides so that no triangle shares an edge with another triangle. As a polyhedron whose faces are regular polygons, it is a Johnson solid. It is a space-filling polyhedron. Its dual polyhedron is also an octahedron.

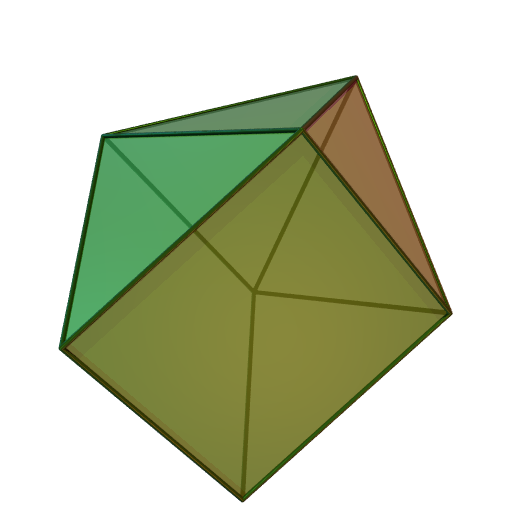
Augmented triangular prism: The result of gluing a triangular prism to a square pyramid, this has six equilateral triangle faces and two square faces. It is also a Johnson solid.

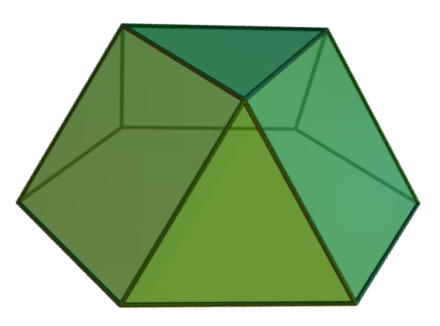
Triangular cupola: Another Johnson solid, this has one regular hexagon face, three square faces, and four equilateral triangle faces.

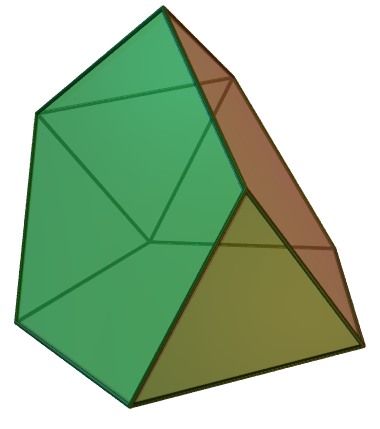
Tridiminished icosahedron: Another Johnson solid, obtained by removing three pentagonal pyramids from a regular icosahedron, resulting in three pentagonal and five triangular faces.

Heptagonal pyramid: One face is a heptagon (usually regular), and the remaining seven faces are triangles (usually isosceles). It is not possible for all triangular faces to be equilateral. It is a self-dual polyhedron.

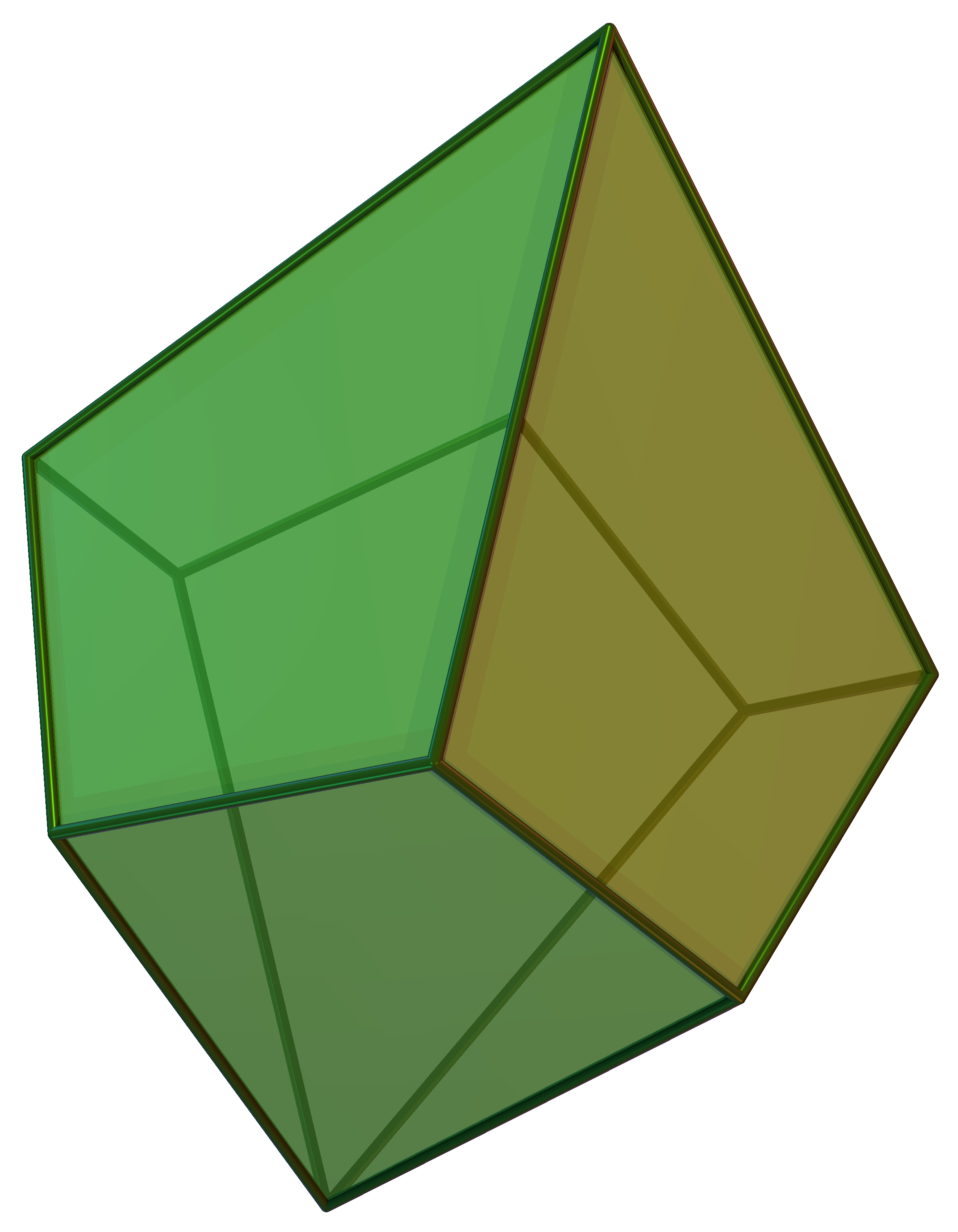
Tetragonal trapezohedron: The eight faces are congruent kites. Up to topological equivalence it is the only octahedron all of whose faces are quadrilaterals.

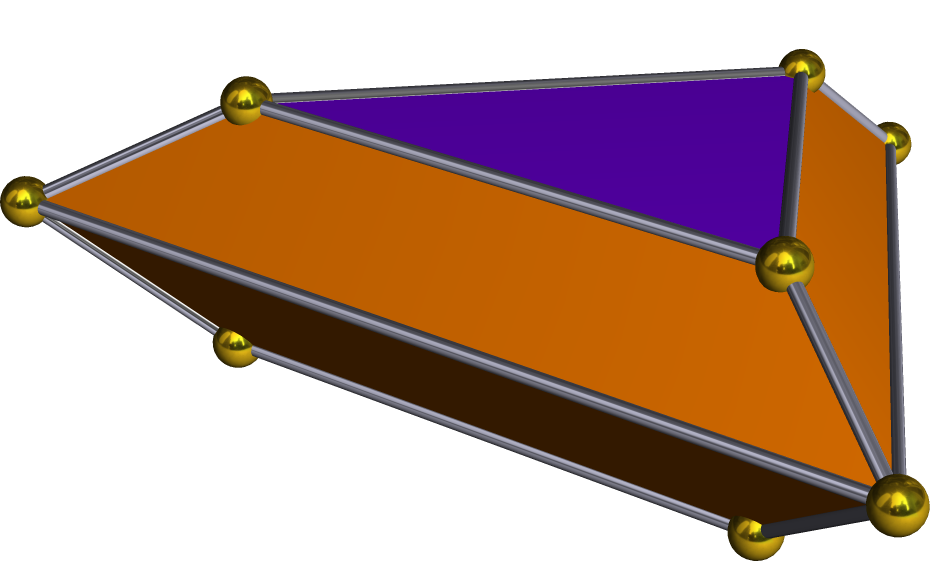
Triangular bifrustum: The dual of an elongated triangular bipyramid (a Johnson solid), this can be realized with six isosceles trapezoid faces and two equilateral triangle faces.

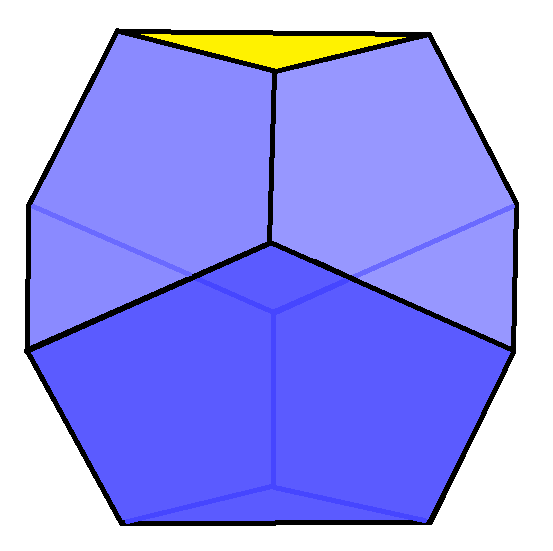
Truncated triangular trapezohedron, also called Dürer's solid: Obtained by truncating two opposite corners of a cube or rhombohedron, this has six pentagon faces and two triangle faces.

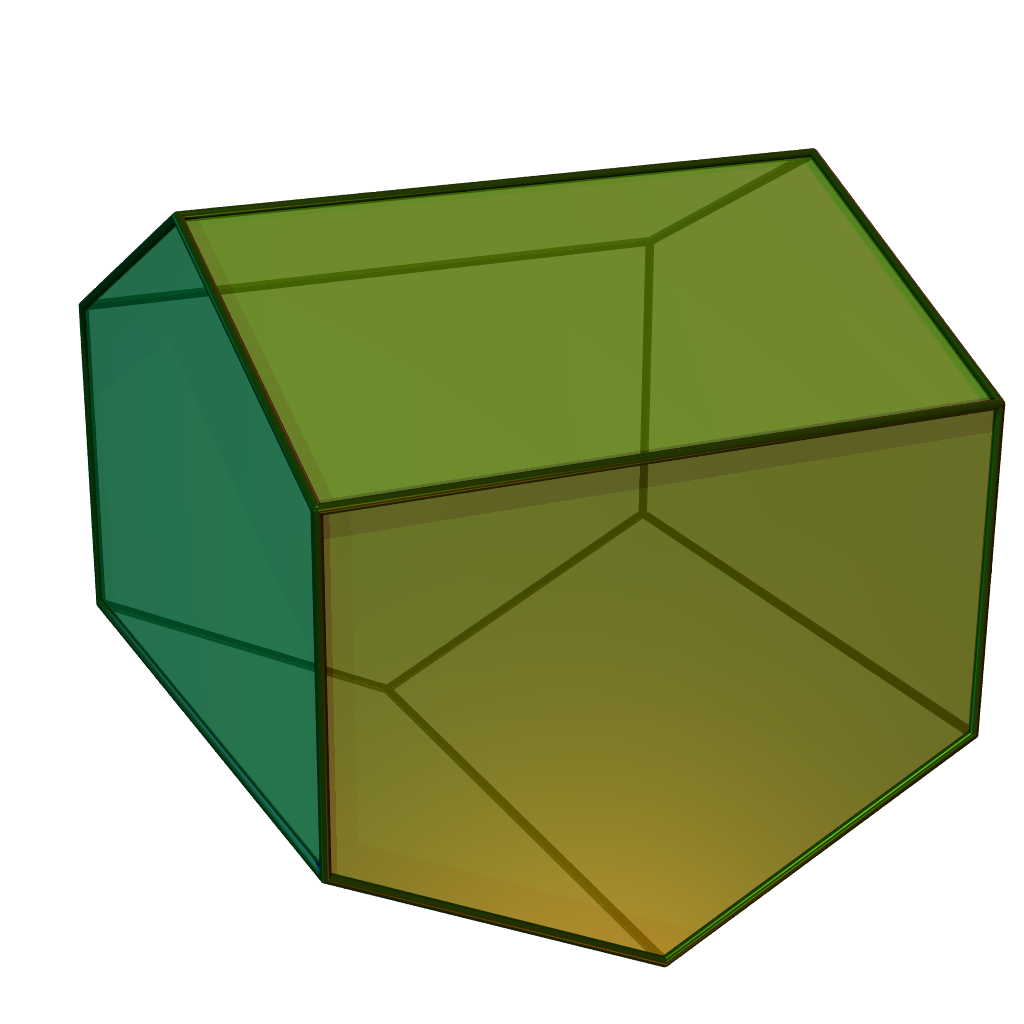
Gabled rhombohedron with four pentagonal faces and four rectangular faces. Like the gyrobifastigium, it is a space-filling polyhedron.
