= Hilbert's third problem =

On dissections between polyhedra

Two polyhedra of equal volume, cut into two pieces which can be reassembled into either polyhedron

The third of Hilbert's problems presented in 1900 was the first to be solved. The problem asks the following:

Given any two polyhedra of equal volume, is it always possible to cut the first into finitely many polyhedral pieces which can be reassembled to yield the second?

Based on earlier writings by Carl Friedrich Gauss, David Hilbert conjectured that this was not always possible. His student Max Dehn confirmed the conjecture with a counterexample.

== History and motivation ==
The formula for the volume of a pyramid, one-third of the product of base area and height, had been known to Euclid. Still, all proofs of it involve some form of limiting process or calculus, notably the method of exhaustion or, in more modern form, Cavalieri's principle. Similar formulas in plane geometry can be proven with more elementary means. Gauss regretted this defect in two of his letters to Christian Ludwig Gerling, who proved that two symmetric tetrahedra are equidecomposable.

Gauss's letters were the motivation for David Hilbert: Is it possible to prove the equality of volume using elementary "cut-and-glue" methods, for arbitrary polyhedra or for the specific cases studied by Euclid? Another motivation for Hilbert dates from the Wallace–Bolyai–Gerwien theorem in the early 19th century, according to which any two polygons of equal area can be cut up into polygonal pieces and reassembled into each other. He used it as a way to axiomatize the area of two-dimensional polygons, in connection with Hilbert's axioms for Euclidean geometry. He later formulated a 20th-century influential set of 23 mathematical problems in 1900 at the International Congress of Mathematicians. In his set, he addressed the third problem on the axiomatization of solid volume, whether every two polyhedra of equal volumes can always be cut into polyhedral pieces and reassembled into each other. (Note: His original problem asked, "for two tetrahedra $T_1$ and $T_2$ with equal base area and equal height, hence equal volume, is it always possible to find a finite number of tetrahedra, so that when these tetrahedra are glued in some way to $T_1$ and also glued to $T_2$, the resulting polyhedra are scissors-congruent?")

Two polyhedra are called scissors-congruent if one can be cut into finitely many polyhedral pieces that can be reassembled to form the other. Any two scissors-congruent polyhedra have the same volume. Hilbert asks about the converse.

== Solution ==
For every polyhedron $P$, Max Dehn defines a value, now known as the Dehn invariant $\operatorname{D}(P)$, with the property that, if $P$ is cut into polyhedral pieces $P_1, P_2, \dots P_n$, then
$$\operatorname{D}(P) = \operatorname{D}(P_1)+\operatorname{D}(P_2)+\cdots + \operatorname{D}(P_n).$$
In particular, if two polyhedra are scissors-congruent, then they have the same Dehn invariant. Dehn then shows that every cube has Dehn invariant zero while every regular tetrahedron has a non-zero Dehn invariant. Therefore, these two shapes cannot be scissors-congruent. This implies that not all polyhedra can be dissected into cubes, hence the answer is negative.

A polyhedron's invariant is defined based on the lengths of its edges and the angles between its faces. If a polyhedron is cut into two, some edges are cut into two, and the corresponding contributions to the Dehn invariants should therefore be additive in the edge lengths. Similarly, if a polyhedron is cut along an edge, the corresponding angle is cut into two. Cutting a polyhedron typically also introduces new edges and angles; their contributions must cancel out. The angles introduced when a cut passes through a face add to $\pi$, and the angles introduced around an edge interior to the polyhedron add to $2\pi$. Therefore, the Dehn invariant is defined in such a way that integer multiples of angles of $\pi$ give a net contribution of zero.

All of the above requirements can be met by defining $\operatorname{D}(P)$ as an element of the tensor product of the real numbers $\R$ (representing lengths of edges) and the quotient space $\R/(\Q\pi)$ (representing angles, with all rational multiples of $\pi$ replaced by zero). For some purposes, this definition can be made using the tensor product of modules over $\Z$ (or equivalently of abelian groups), while other aspects of this topic make use of a vector space structure on the invariants, obtained by considering the two factors $\R$ and $\R/(\Q\pi)$ to be vector spaces over $\Q$ and taking the tensor product of vector spaces over $\Q$. This choice of structure in the definition does not make a difference in whether two Dehn invariants, defined in either way, are equal or unequal.

For any edge $e$ of a polyhedron $P$, let $\ell(e)$ be its length and let $\theta(e)$ denote the dihedral angle of the two faces of $P$ that meet at $e$, measured in radians and considered modulo rational multiples of $\pi$. The Dehn invariant is then defined as
$$\operatorname{D}(P) = \sum_{e} \ell(e)\otimes \theta(e)$$
where the sum is taken over all edges $e$ of the polyhedron $P$. It is a valuation.

== Further information ==
In light of Dehn's theorem above, one might ask "which polyhedra are scissors-congruent"? In 1965, Jean-Pierre Sydler showed that two polyhedra are scissors-congruent if and only if they have the same volume and the same Dehn invariant. Børge Jessen later extended Sydler's results to four dimensions. In 1990, Dupont and Sah provided a simpler proof of Sydler's result by reinterpreting it as a theorem about the homology of certain classical groups.

Debrunner showed in 1980 that the Dehn invariant of any polyhedron with which all of three-dimensional space can be tiled periodically is zero.

Unsolved problem in mathematics
In spherical or hyperbolic geometry, must polyhedra with the same volume and Dehn invariant be scissors-congruent?
More unsolved problems in mathematics

Jessen also posed the question of whether the analogue of Jessen's results remained true for spherical geometry and hyperbolic geometry. In these geometries, Dehn's method continues to work, and shows that when two polyhedra are scissors-congruent, their Dehn invariants are equal. However, it remains an open problem whether pairs of polyhedra with the same volume and the same Dehn invariant, in these geometries, are always scissors-congruent.

Hilbert's third problem was also proposed independently by Władysław Kretkowski for a math contest in 1882 by the Academy of Arts and Sciences of Kraków, and was solved by Ludwik Antoni Birkenmajer using a different method than Dehn's. Birkenmajer did not publish the result, and the original manuscript containing his solution was rediscovered years later.

== See also ==
- Hill tetrahedron
- Onorato Nicoletti
