= Arthur Harold Stone =

British mathematician (1916–2000)

Arthur Harold Stone (30 September 1916 – 6 August 2000) was a British mathematician, born in London, who worked at the universities of Manchester and Rochester, mostly in topology. His wife was American mathematician Dorothy Maharam.

Stone studied at Trinity College, Cambridge. His first paper dealt with squaring the square, he proved the Erdős–Stone theorem with Paul Erdős and is credited with the discovery of the first two flexagons, a trihexaflexagon and a hexahexaflexagon while he was a student at Princeton University in 1939. His Ph.D. thesis, Connectedness and Coherence, was written in 1941 under the direction of Solomon Lefschetz. He served as a referee for The American Mathematical Monthly journal in the 1980s.

The Stone metrization theorem has been named after him, and he was a member of a group of mathematicians who published pseudonymously as Blanche Descartes. He is not to be confused with American mathematician Marshall Harvey Stone.

== See also ==
- Ham sandwich theorem

== Sources ==
- "Brooks, Smith, Stone, Tutte (Part I)".
- "An Interview with Arthur Stone". Archived from the original on 7 June 2008.
