= Kokotsakis polyhedron =

Flexible polyhedron

A Kokotsakis polyhedron is a polyhedral surface in three-dimensional space consisting of any polygon as its base and quadrilaterals alternating with triangles as its lateral faces; for an $n$-sided polygonal base, there are $n$ quadrilaterals and $n$ triangles.

== Properties and history ==
The polyhedron was discovered when Kokotsakis (1933) studied the meshes wherein the perimeter of a polygon is surrounded by other polygons, showing an infinitesimally flexible in the case of a quadrilateral base, which was later known as Kokotsakis mesh. More examples of this special case of a Kokotsakis polyhedron were discovered by other mathematicians. Here, a polyhedron is flexible if the shape can be continuously changed while preserving the faces unchanged. Each of its vertexes is said to be "developable", meaning the sum of its plane angle is $2 \pi$, resulting in the polyhedral surface being an origami crease pattern, which satisfies Kawasaki's theorem. The work was done by Izmestiev (2017) in which classifying the folding angle for a Kokotsakis polyhedron in the case of a quadrangular base.

Stachel (2010) conjectured that there exists no polynomial system of irreducible resultant about the flexibility of a Kokotsakis polyhedron, which was later Izmestiev (2017) disproved it by showing the Kokotsakis polyhedron is orthodiagonal anti-involutive, meaning the planar angles has conditions such as all quadrilaterals are spherically orthodiagonal (any intersecting two diagonals in a quadrilateral form a right angle) and elliptic (the sum and difference of the edges of a quadrilateral are not equal to $0 \bmod 2\pi$), and the involution at common vertices are opposite.

== Kokotsakis mesh ==
As mentioned above, the Kokotsakis mesh was studied by Kokotsakis (1933), showing an infinitesimally flexible polyhedron in the case of a quadrilateral base. In general, the Kokotsakis mesh is defined as the infinite tessellations consisting of quadrilateral with congruent convex that is not trapezoidal and parallelogram. In the case of a quadrangle mesh, it is planar symmetric (exchanging adjacent vertices in-between), translation (two adjacent vertices are translated, mapping the faces), isogonal (opposite angles at every vertex is equal or complementary), orthogonal (the faces are parallel to the planes), and line-symmetric (appearance is symmetrical by half-rotating between two adjacent vertices around an axis passing through).

The Kokotsakis mesh can be used to construct cylindrical polyhedra.

== See also ==
- Bricard octahedron, a member of flexible polyhedra.

== Bibliography ==
- Erofeev, Ivan; Ivanov, Grigory (2020), "Orthodiagonal anti-involutive Kokotsakis polyhedra" (PDF), Mechanism and Machine Theory, 146: 1–20, doi:10.1016/j.mechmachtheory.2019.103713.
- Hull, Thomas C. (2021), Origametry: Mathematical Methods in Paper Folding, Cambridge University Press, ISBN 978-1-108-47872-4.
- Izmestiev, Ivan (July 8–14, 2012), "Flexible Kokotsakis polyhedra and elliptic functions" (PDF), in Bobenko, Alexander I.; Kenyon, Richard; Schroder, Peter; Ziegler, Gunter M. (eds.), Discrete Differential Geometry, vol. 9, Mathematisches Forschungsinstitut Oberwolfach, pp. 2077–2137, doi:10.4171/OWR/2012/34.
- Izmestiev, Ivan (2017), "Classification of Flexible Kokotsakis Polyhedra with Quadrangular Base", International Mathematics Research Notices, 2017 (3): 715–808, arXiv:1411.0289, doi:10.1093/imrn/rnw055.
- Cai, Jianguo; Zhang, Yuting; Xu, Yixiang; Zhou, Ya; Feng, Jian (2016), "The Foldability of Cylindrical Foldable Structures Based on Rigid Origami" (PDF), Journal of Mechanical Design, 138 (3): 1–8, doi:10.1115/1.4032194.
- Kokotsakis, A. (1933), "Über bewegliche Polyeder", Mathematische Annalen, 107: 627–647, doi:10.1007/BF01448912.
- Stachel, Hellmuth (2010), "A kinematic approach to Kokotsakis meshes", Computer Aided Geometric Design, 27 (6): 428–437, doi:10.1016/j.cagd.2010.05.002.
- Stachel, Hellmuth (2014), "On the flexibility and symmetry of overconstrained mechanisms", Philosophical Transactions of the Royal Society A, 372 (2008), doi:10.1098/rsta.2012.0040, PMC 3871300, PMID 24379430
- Stachel, Hellmuth (2015), "Flexible Polyhedral Surfaces with Two Flat Poses", Symmetry, 7 (2): 774–787, Bibcode:2015Symm....7..774S, doi:10.3390/sym7020774, hdl:20.500.12708/151842.
- Wittenburg, Jens (2021), "Polyhedral Cylinders Formed by Kokotsakis Meshes", Journal for Geometry and Graphics, 25 (2): 171–186.
