= Robert Dahlander =

Swedish engineer and administrative leader (1870-1935)

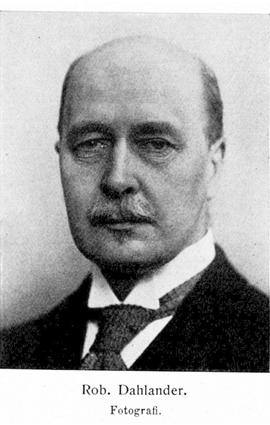
- Occupation: Engineer

Robert Dahlander (9 June 1870 – 18 October 1935) was a Swedish engineer and public agency administrator. He was also highly active and commissioner in several technological associations in the fields of gas and electricity.

Born in Gothenburg Sweden, he is internationally best known for the co-innovation of the Dahlander connection while employed at ASEA, that through a slightly altered pole connection allows a single-winded induction motor to run at two different speeds depending on which connectors are used.
