= Kaleidocycle =

Three-dimensional geometric shape

Regular-based right pyramids
Six tetrahedra whose vertices meet at the center. Blue edges are doubled with pairs of faces hidden.
Faces	24 isosceles triangles
Edges	36 (6 as degenerate pairs)
Vertices	12
Symmetry group	C_{3v}, [3], (*33), order 6
Properties	torus
Net

A kaleidocycle before it is wrapped into a ring makes a chain of 6 disphenoids connected edge to edge.

A kaleidocycle or flextangle is a flexible polyhedron connecting six tetrahedra (or disphenoids) on opposite edges into a cycle. If the faces of the disphenoids are equilateral triangles, it can be constructed from a stretched triangular tiling net with four triangles in one direction and an even number in the other direction.

The kaleidocycle has degenerate pairs of coinciding edges in transition, which function as hinges. The kaleidocycle has an additional property that it can be continuously twisted around a ring axis, showing 4 sets of 6 triangular faces. The kaleidocycle is invariant under twists about its ring axis by $k\pi/2$, where $k$ is an integer, and can therefore be continuously twisted.

Kaleidocycles can be constructed from a single piece of paper (with dimensions $l \times 2l$) without tearing or using adhesive. Because of this and their continuous twisting property, they are often given as examples of simple origami toys. The kaleidocycle is sometimes called a flexahedron in analogy to the planar flexagon, which has similar symmetry under flexing transformations.

== Examples ==

This animation demonstrates the flexing of a kaleidocycle around its ring axis. The four sets of 6 triangular faces are shown in different colours (with every other face in each set of six shown in grey for contrast).

== Variations ==
Beyond 6 sides, higher even numbers of tetrahedra, 8, 10, 12, etc., can be chained together. These models will leave a central gap, depending on the proportions of the triangle faces.

== History ==
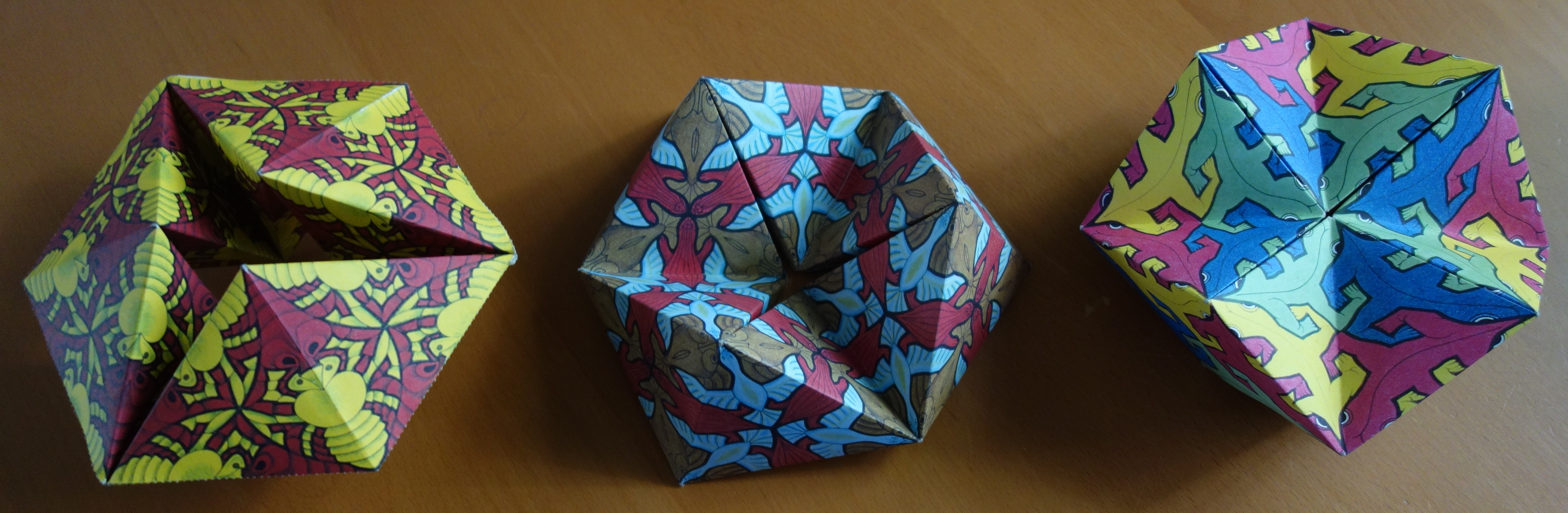
Crafted kaleidocycles from the book M. C. Escher: Kaleidocycles, based on templates from Doris Schattschneider.

In 1958, during a project focused on developing structural configurations for paper, Wallace Walker discovered a geometric net consisting of sixty isosceles triangles that, when scored and folded, form a movable three-dimensional ring capable of continuous inversion. This was patented as IsoAxis (US 3302321) and served as the inspiration for Doris Schattschneider, from Moravian College, to build a similar ring using tetrahedrons instead.

Wallace Walker coined the word kaleidocycle in the 1950s from the Greek kalos (beautiful), eidos (form), and kyklos (ring).

In 1977 Doris Schattschneider and Wallace Walker published a book about them using M.C. Escher patterns.

== Cultural uses ==
The shape was called a flextangle by characters in the 2018 science fantasy adventure film A Wrinkle in Time, which depicted a paper model with its inner faces colored with hearts and patterns which become hidden when those faces are folded together. The paper toy suggested how space and time could be folded to explain the magical travels of the story. The toy is given to the daughter by her father at the start of the movie and its hearts show how love can be enfolded and still be there, even after the father mysteriously disappears.

== See also ==
- Flexagon
- IsoAxis
- Flexible polyhedron
- Schwarz lantern
