= Jean-Pierre Sydler =

Swiss mathematician (1921–1988)

Jean-Pierre Sydler (1921-1988) was a Swiss mathematician and a librarian, well known for his work in geometry, most notably on Hilbert's third problem and the Sydler π/4 polyhedron.

A solution to Sydler's problem of making a polyhedron with a single non-90° angle (between faces)

== Biography ==
Sydler was born in 1921 in Neuchâtel, Switzerland. He graduated from ETH Zürich in 1943 and received a doctorate in 1947. In 1950 he became a librarian at the ETH while continuing to publish mathematical papers in his spare time. In 1960 he received a prize of the Danish Academy of Sciences for his work on scissors congruence. In 1963 he became a director of the ETH library and pioneered the use of automatisation. He continued serving as a director until the retirement in 1986. He died in 1988 in Zürich.

- Greg N. Frederickson, Dissections: Plane and Fancy, Cambridge University Press, 2003.
