= Rational dependence =

In mathematics, a collection of real numbers is rationally independent if none of them can be written as a linear combination of the other numbers in the collection with rational coefficients. A collection of numbers which is not rationally independent is called rationally dependent. For instance we have the following example.

$$\begin{matrix}
\mbox{independent}\qquad\\
\underbrace{
\overbrace{
3,\quad
\sqrt{8}\quad
},
1+\sqrt{2}
}\\
\mbox{dependent}\\
\end{matrix}$$

Because if we let $x=3, y=\sqrt{8}$, then $1+\sqrt{2}=\frac{1}{3}x+\frac{1}{2}y$.

== Formal definition ==
The real numbers ω_{1}, ω_{2}, ... , ω_{n} are said to be rationally dependent if there exist integers k_{1}, k_{2}, ... , k_{n}, not all of which are zero, such that

$$k_1 \omega_1 + k_2 \omega_2 +  \cdots + k_n \omega_n = 0.$$

If such integers do not exist, then the vectors are said to be rationally independent. This condition can be reformulated as follows: ω_{1}, ω_{2}, ... , ω_{n} are rationally independent if the only n-tuple of integers k_{1}, k_{2}, ... , k_{n} such that

$$k_1 \omega_1 + k_2 \omega_2 +  \cdots + k_n \omega_n = 0$$

is the trivial solution in which every k_{i} is zero.

The real numbers form a vector space over the rational numbers, and this is equivalent to the usual definition of linear independence in this vector space.

== See also ==
- Baker's theorem
- Dehn invariant
- Gelfond–Schneider theorem
- Hamel basis
- Hodge conjecture
- Lindemann–Weierstrass theorem
- Linear flow on the torus
- Schanuel's conjecture

== Bibliography ==
- Anatole Katok and Boris Hasselblatt (1996). Introduction to the modern theory of dynamical systems. Cambridge. ISBN 0-521-57557-5.
