= Onorato Nicoletti =

Italian mathematician (1872–1929)

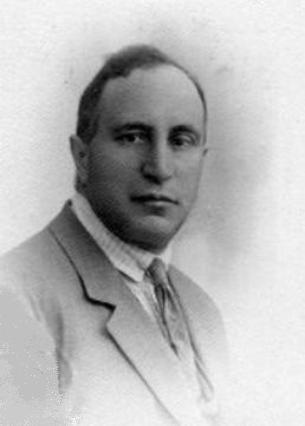
Onoratio Nicoletti

Onorato Nicoletti (21 June 1872 – 31 December 1929) was an Italian mathematician.

== Biography ==
Nicoletti received his laurea in 1894 from the Scuola Normale di Pisa. In 1898, he became a professor of infinitesimal calculus at the University of Modena. After two years, he returned to Pisa, where he was a teacher of algebra, and then, after the death of Ulisse Dini, of infinitesimal calculus.

He published works in various fields of mathematics, including numerical analysis, infinitesimal analysis, the equations related to hermitian matrices, and differential equations. He made original contributions to Max Dehn's theory of the equivalence of polyhedra under polyhedral dissection and reassembly (scissors-congruence), extending and generalizing the theory with an entire class of new relations.

Nicoletti collaborated in the writing of Enciclopedia Hoepli delle Matematiche elementari e complementi (published from 1930 to 1951) with the contribution of two monographic articles: Forme razionali di una o più variabili (Rational forms of one or more variables) and Proprietà generali delle funzioni algebriche (General properties of algebraic functions).

A leading expert in mathematics education, he edited with Roberto Marcolongo a series of successful editions for secondary schools.

Nicoletti was an Invited Speaker of the ICM in Rome.

== Selected publications ==
- "Su un sistema di equazioni a derivate parziali del secondo ordine." Rendic. Acc. Lincei,(5) 4 (1895): 197–202.
- "Sulle condizioni iniziali che determiniano gli integrali della differenziali ordinazie Atti della R. Acc. Sc. Torino. 1898 (1897): 746–759.
- "Sulla teoria della convergenza degli algoritmi di iterazione." Annali di Matematica Pura ed Applicata (1898–1922) 14, no. 1 (1908): 1–32.
- "Sulla caratteristica delle matrici di Sylvester e di Bezout." Rendiconti del Circolo Matematico di Palermo (1884–1940) 28, no. 1 (1909): 29–32. doi:10.1007/BF03018209
- "Sulla equivalenza dei poliedri." Rendiconti del Circolo Matematico di Palermo (1884–1940) 37, no. 1 (1914): 47–75.
- with Eugenio Bertini and Luigi Bianchi: "Relazione sulla memoria di Albanese «Intorno ad alcuni concetti e teoremi fondamentali sui sistemi di curve d'una superficie algebrica»." Annali della Scuola Normale Superiore di Pisa-Classe di Scienze 14 (1922): XI–XV.
- "Un teorema del limite." Annali di Matematica Pura ed Applicata 1, no. 1 (1924): 91–104. doi:10.1007/BF02409915
