= Counting on Frameworks =

2001 mathematics book by Jack E. Graver

- Author: Jack E. Graver
- Language: English
- Series: Dolciani Mathematical Expositions
- Release number: 25
- Subject: Structural rigidity
- Genre: Mathematics
- Publisher: Mathematical Association of America
- Publication date: 2001
- Publication place: United States

Counting on Frameworks: Mathematics to Aid the Design of Rigid Structures is an undergraduate-level book on the mathematics of structural rigidity. It was written by Jack E. Graver and published in 2001 by the Mathematical Association of America as volume 25 of the Dolciani Mathematical Expositions book series. The Basic Library List Committee of the Mathematical Association of America has recommended its inclusion by undergraduate mathematics libraries.

== Topics ==
The problems considered by Counting on Frameworks primarily concern systems of rigid rods, connected to each other by flexible joints at their ends; the question is whether these connections fix such a framework into a single position, or whether it can flex continuously through multiple positions. Variations of this problem include the simplest way to add rods to a framework to make it rigid, or the resilience of a framework against the failure of one of its rods.

To study this question, Graver has organized Counting on Frameworks into four chapters. The first chapter studies square grids and methods of cross bracing the grid to make it rigid, as a way of introducing the notion of the degrees of freedom of a mechanical system. The second chapter provides an introduction to graph theory, the one-dimensional theory of rigidity through the analysis of the connected components of graphs, and a reformulation of the grid bracing problem in terms of connectivity of an associated bipartite graph. Chapter three concerns two-dimensional rigidity, the concepts of infinitesimal and generic rigidity, the combinatorial and algorithmic aspects of the subject, and the obstacles to extending this theory to three dimensions. A final chapter describes the history of rigidity theory, applications including mechanical linkages, geodesic domes, tensegrity, the rigidity of molecules in chemistry, and even art. It also discusses open problems for research in this area.

== Audience and reception ==
Counting on Frameworks expects its readers to be familiar with multivariable calculus, but beyond that level of background material it does not demand much mathematical sophistication. More generally, the editors of Mathematika recommend it to "Any reader with at least a slight mathematical background". To avoid demanding too much background of its readers, it is unable to present full proofs of some of its results, instead presenting them as intuitive proof sketches. A more advanced and rigorous treatment of the same material can be found in Combinatorial Rigidity (1993), a graduate textbook co-authored by Graver.

It includes exercises for students, making it suitable as an undergraduate textbook. Reviewer Tiong Seng Tay describes it as "an excellent expository book".
