= Flexagon =

Paper model

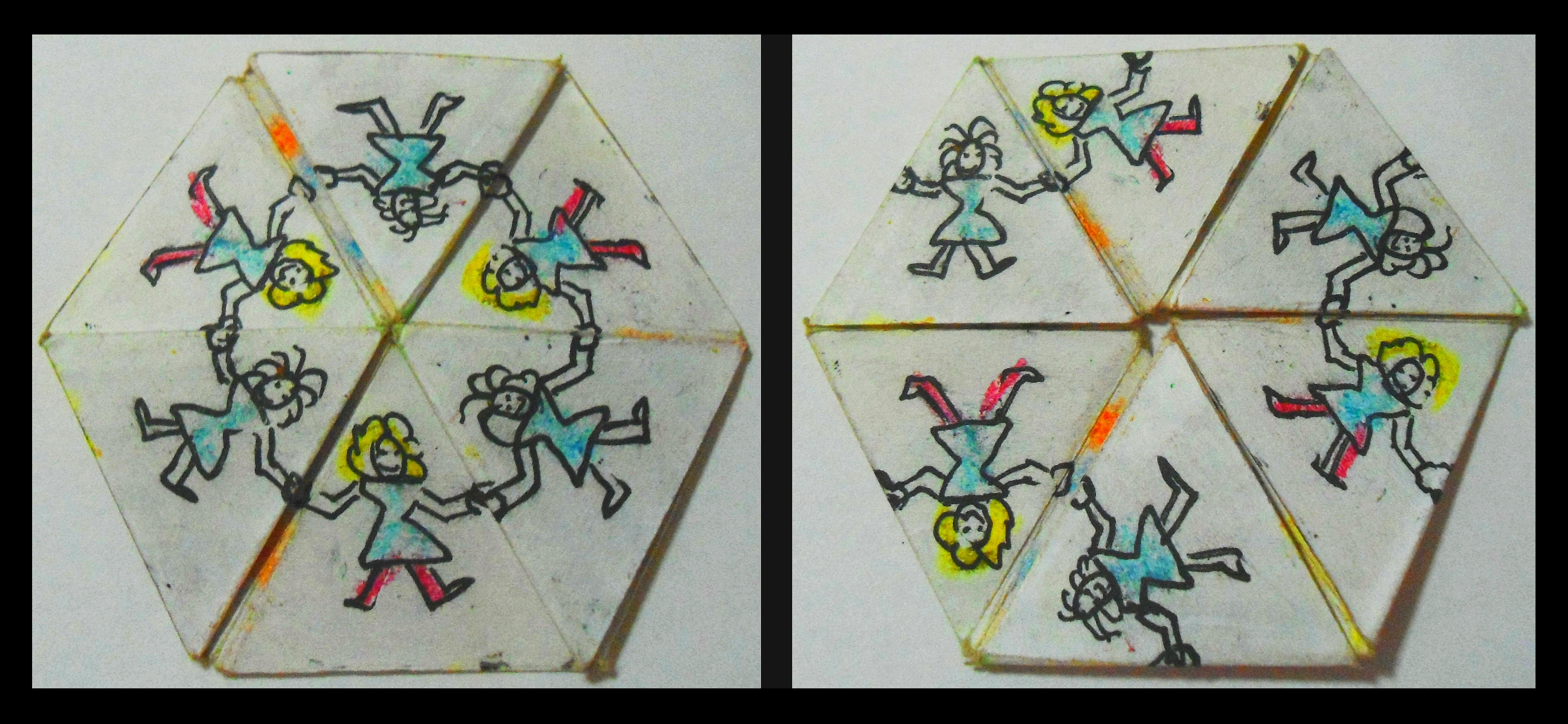
A hexaflexagon, shown with the same face in two configurations

In geometry, flexagons are flat models, usually constructed by folding strips of paper, that can be flexed or folded in certain ways to reveal faces besides the two that were originally on the back and front.

Flexagons are usually square or rectangular (tetraflexagons) or hexagonal (hexaflexagons). A prefix can be added to the name to indicate the number of faces that the model can display, including the two faces (back and front) that are visible before flexing. For example, a hexaflexagon with a total of six faces is called a hexahexaflexagon.

In hexaflexagon theory (that is, concerning flexagons with six sides), flexagons are usually defined in terms of pats.

Two flexagons are equivalent if one can be transformed to the other by a series of pinches and rotations. Flexagon equivalence is an equivalence relation.

== History ==
=== Discovery and introduction of the hexaflexagon ===
The discovery of the first flexagon, a trihexaflexagon, is credited to the British mathematician Arthur H. Stone, while he was a student at Princeton University in the United States in 1939. His new American paper would not fit in his English binder so he cut off the ends of the paper and began folding them into different shapes. One of these formed a trihexaflexagon. Stone's colleagues Bryant Tuckerman, Richard Feynman, and John Tukey became interested in the idea and formed the Princeton Flexagon Committee. Tuckerman worked out a topological method, called the Tuckerman traverse, for revealing all the faces of a flexagon. Tuckerman traverses are shown as a diagram that maps each face of the flexagon to each other face. In doing so, he realized that each face does not always appear in the same state.

Flexagons were introduced to the general public by Martin Gardner in the December 1956 issue of Scientific American in an article so well-received that it launched Gardner's "Mathematical Games" column which then ran in that magazine for the next twenty-five years. In 1974, the magician Doug Henning included a construct-your-own hexaflexagon with the original cast recording of his Broadway show The Magic Show.

=== Attempted commercial development ===
In 1955, Russell Rogers and Leonard D'Andrea of Homestead Park, Pennsylvania applied for a patent, and in 1959 they were granted U.S. Patent number 2,883,195 for the hexahexaflexagon, under the title "Changeable Amusement Devices and the Like."

Their patent imagined possible applications of the device "as a toy, as an advertising display device, or as an educational geometric device." A few such novelties were produced by the Herbick & Held Printing Company, the printing company in Pittsburgh where Rogers worked, but the device, marketed as the "Hexmo", failed to catch on.

== Varieties ==
=== Tetraflexagons ===
Ernest Ranucci's tetra-tetra flexagon is easy to construct.

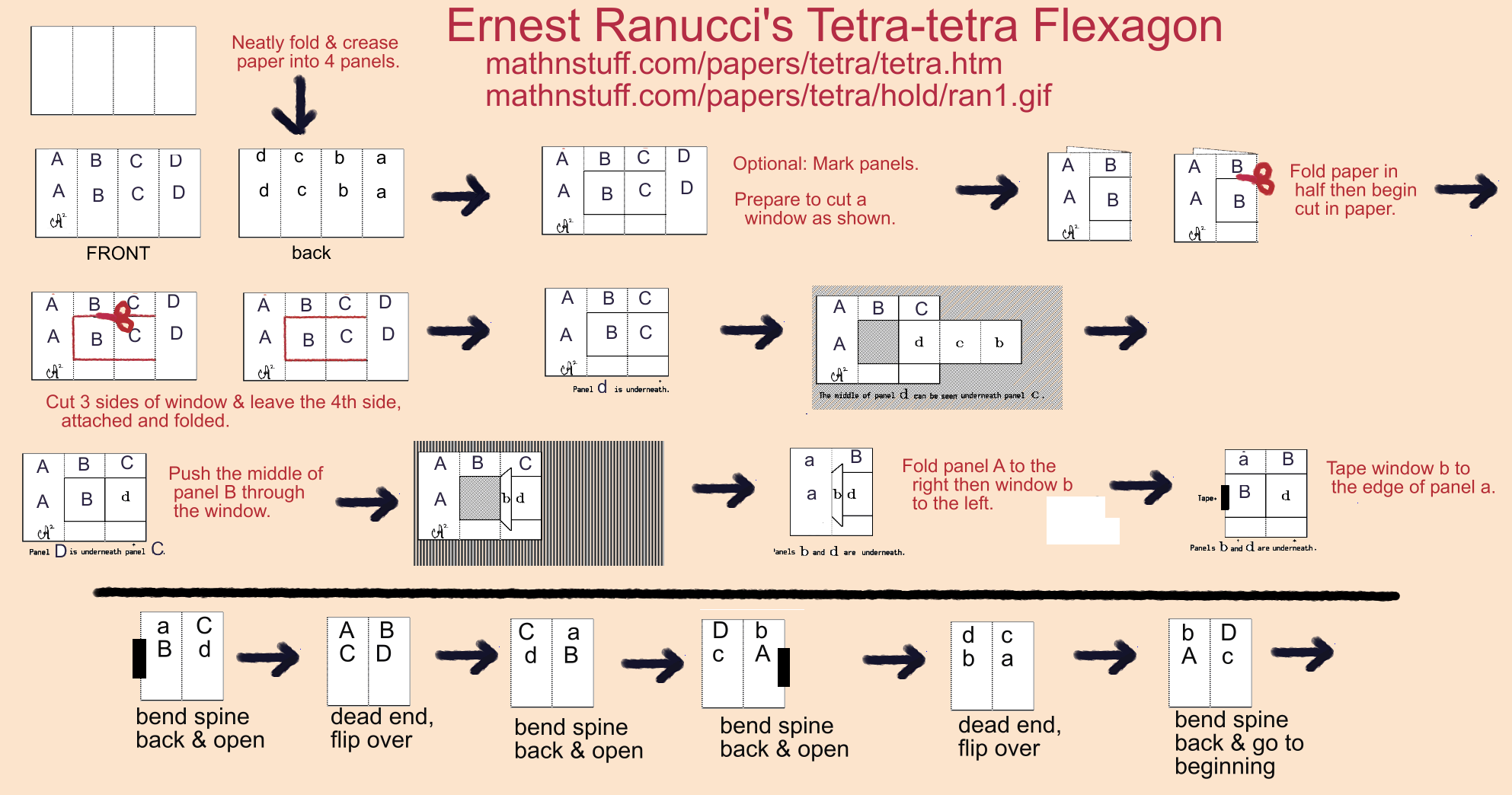
Ranucci's tetratetraflexagon

==== Tritetraflexagon ====
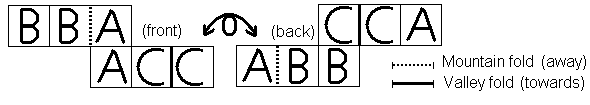
A tritetraflexagon can be folded from a strip of paper as shown.

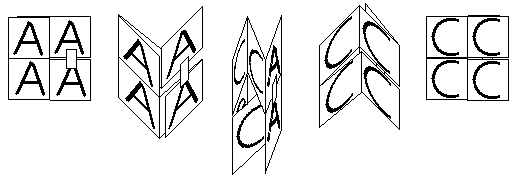
This figure has two faces visible, built of squares marked with As and Bs. The face of Cs is hidden inside the flexagon.

The tritetraflexagon is the simplest tetraflexagon (flexagon with square sides). The "tri" in the name means it has three faces, two of which are visible at any given time if the flexagon is pressed flat. The construction of the tritetraflexagon is similar to the mechanism used in the traditional Jacob's Ladder children's toy, in Rubik's Magic and in the magic wallet trick or the Himber wallet.

The tritetraflexagon has two dead ends, where you cannot flex forward. To get to another face you must either flex backwards or flip the flexagon over.

Tritetraflexagon traverse

==== Hexatetraflexagon ====
A more complicated cyclic hexatetraflexagon requires no gluing. A cyclic hexatetraflexagon does not have any "dead ends", but the person making it can keep folding it until they reach the starting position. If the sides are colored in the process, the states can be seen more clearly.

Hexatetraflexagon traverse

Contrary to the tritetraflexagon, the hexatetraflexagon has no dead ends, and does not ever need to be flexed backwards.

=== Hexaflexagons ===
Hexaflexagons come in great variety, distinguished by the number of faces that can be achieved by flexing the assembled figure. (Note that the word hexaflexagons [with no prefixes] can sometimes refer to an ordinary hexahexaflexagon, with six sides instead of other numbers.)

==== Trihexaflexagon ====
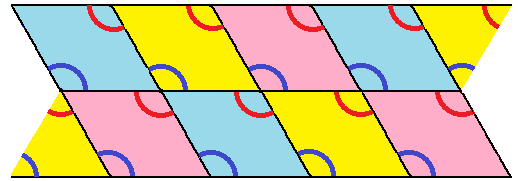
This trihexaflexagon template shows 3 colors of 9 triangles, printed on one side, and folded to be colored on both sides. The two yellow triangles on the ends will end up taped together. The red and blue arcs are seen as full circles on the inside of one side or the other when folded.

A hexaflexagon with three faces is the simplest of the hexaflexagons to make and to manage, and is made from a single strip of paper, divided into nine equilateral triangles. (Some patterns provide ten triangles, two of which are glued together in the final assembly.)

To assemble, the strip is folded every third triangle, connecting back to itself after three inversions in the manner of the international recycling symbol. This makes a Möbius strip whose single edge forms a trefoil knot.

==== Hexahexaflexagon ====
This hexaflexagon has six faces. It is made up of nineteen triangles folded from a strip of paper.

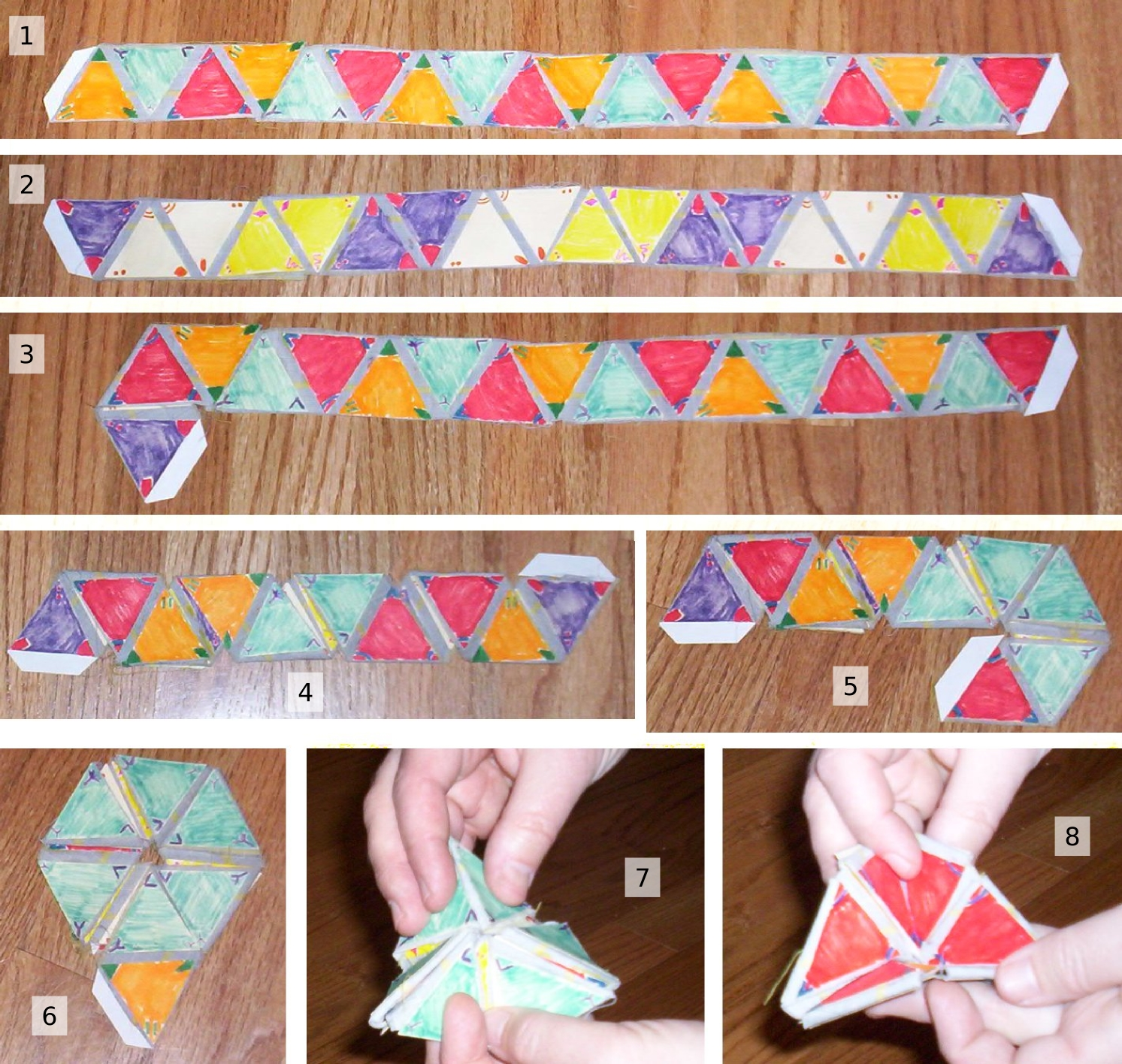
Figures 1-6 show the construction of a hexaflexagon made out of cardboard triangles on a backing made from a strip of cloth. It has been decorated in six colours; orange, blue, and red in figure 1 correspond to 1, 2, and 3 in the diagram above. The opposite side, figure 2, is decorated with purple, gray, and yellow. Note the different patterns used for the colors on the two sides. Figure 3 shows the first fold, and figure 4 the result of the first nine folds, which form a spiral. Figures 5-6 show the final folding of the spiral to make a hexagon; in 5, two red faces have been hidden by a valley fold, and in 6, two red faces on the bottom side have been hidden by a mountain fold. After figure 6, the final loose triangle is folded over and attached to the other end of the original strip so that one side is all blue, and the other all orange. Photos 7 and 8 show the process of everting the hexaflexagon to show the formerly hidden red triangles. By further manipulations, all six colors can be exposed.

Once folded, faces 1, 2, and 3 are easier to find than faces 4, 5, and 6.

An easy way to expose all six faces is using the Tuckerman traverse, named after Bryant Tuckerman, one of the first to investigate the properties of hexaflexagons. The Tuckerman traverse involves the repeated flexing by pinching one corner and flex from exactly the same corner every time. If the corner refuses to open, move to an adjacent corner and keep flexing. This procedure brings you to a 12-face cycle. During this procedure, however, 1, 2, and 3 show up three times as frequently as 4, 5, and 6. The cycle proceeds as follows:

1 → 3 → 6 → 1 → 3 → 2 → 4 → 3 → 2 → 1 → 5 → 2

And then back to 1 again.

Each color/face can also be exposed in more than one way. In figure 6, for example, each blue triangle has at the center its corner decorated with a wedge, but it is also possible, for example, to make the ones decorated with Y's come to the center. There are 18 such possible configurations for triangles with different colors, and they can be seen by flexing the hexahexaflexagon in all possible ways in theory, but only 15 can be flexed by the ordinary hexahexaflexagon. The 3 extra configurations are impossible due to the arrangement of the 4, 5, and 6 tiles at the back flap. (The 60-degree angles in the rhombi formed by the adjacent 4, 5, or 6 tiles will only appear on the sides and never will appear at the center because it would require one to cut the strip, which is topologically forbidden.)

Hexahexaflexagons can be constructed from different shaped nets of eighteen equilateral triangles. One hexahexaflexagon, constructed from an irregular paper strip, is almost identical to the one shown above, except that all 18 configurations can be flexed on this version.

==== Other hexaflexagons ====
While the most commonly seen hexaflexagons have either three or six faces, variations exist with any number of faces. Straight strips produce hexaflexagons with a multiple of three number of faces. Other numbers are obtained from nonstraight strips, that are just straight strips with some joints folded, eliminating some faces. Many strips can be folded in different ways, producing different hexaflexagons, with different folding maps.

=== Higher order flexagons ===
==== Right octaflexagon and right dodecaflexagon ====
In these more recently discovered flexagons, each square or equilateral triangular face of a conventional flexagon is further divided into two right triangles, permitting additional flexing modes. The division of the square faces of tetraflexagons into right isosceles triangles yields the octaflexagons, and the division of the triangular faces of the hexaflexagons into 30-60-90 right triangles yields the dodecaflexagons.

==== Pentaflexagon and right decaflexagon ====
In its flat state, the pentaflexagon looks much like the Chrysler logo: a regular pentagon divided from the center into five isosceles triangles, with angles 72–54–54. Because of its fivefold symmetry, the pentaflexagon cannot be folded in half. However, a complex series of flexes results in its transformation from displaying sides one and two on the front and back, to displaying its previously hidden sides three and four.

By further dividing the 72-54-54 triangles of the pentaflexagon into 36-54-90 right triangles produces one variation of the 10-sided decaflexagon.

==== Generalized isosceles n-flexagon ====
The pentaflexagon is one of an infinite sequence of flexagons based on dividing a regular n-gon into n isosceles triangles. Other flexagons include the heptaflexagon, the isosceles octaflexagon, the enneaflexagon, and others.

==== Nonplanar pentaflexagon and nonplanar heptaflexagon ====
Harold V. McIntosh also describes "nonplanar" flexagons (i.e., ones which cannot be flexed so they lie flat); ones folded from pentagons called pentaflexagons, and from heptagons called heptaflexagons. These should be distinguished from the "ordinary" pentaflexagons and heptaflexagons described above, which are made out of isosceles triangles, and they can be made to lie flat.

== In popular culture ==
Flexagons are also a popular book structure used by artist's book creators such as Julie Chen (Life Cycle) and Edward H. Hutchins (Album and Voces de México). Instructions for making tetra-tetra-flexagon and cross-flexagons are included in Making Handmade Books: 100+ Bindings, Structures and Forms by Alisa Golden.

A high-order hexaflexagon was used as a plot element in Piers Anthony's novel 0̅X̅, in which a flex was analogous to the travel between alternate universes.

Vi Hart, a well-known recreational mathematician and public educator, gained attention for their video on hexaflexagons.

== See also ==
- Cayley tree
- Geometric group theory
- Kaleidocycle

== Bibliography ==
- Martin Gardner wrote an excellent introduction to hexaflexagons in the December 1956 Mathematical Games column in Scientific American. It also appears in:
  - The "Scientific American" Book of Mathematical Puzzles and Diversions. Simon & Schuster. 1959.
  - Hexaflexagons and Other Mathematical Diversions: The First "Scientific American" Book of Puzzles and Games. University of Chicago Press. 1988. ISBN 0-226-28254-6.
  - The Colossal Book of Mathematics. W. W. Norton & Co. 2001. ISBN 0-393-02023-1.
  - Hexaflexagons, Probability Paradoxes, and the Tower of Hanoi: Martin Gardner's First Book of Mathematical Puzzles and Games. Cambridge University Press. 2008. ISBN 978-0-521-73525-4.
  - Gardner, Martin (January 2012). "Hexaflexagons". The College Mathematics Journal. 43 (1): 2–5. doi:10.4169/college.math.j.43.1.002. JSTOR 10.4169/college.math.j.43.1.002. S2CID 218544330. The issue also contains another article by Pook, and one by Iacob, McLean, and Hua.
- Jones, Madeline (1966). The Mysterious Flexagons: An Introduction to a Fascinating New Concept in Paper Folding. Crown Publishers.
- Mitchell, David (2000). The Magic of Flexagons – Paper curiosities to cut out and make. Tarquin. ISBN 1-899618-28-7.
- Pook, Les (2006). Flexagons Inside Out. Cambridge University Press. ISBN 0-521-81970-9.
- Pook, Les (2009). Serious Fun with Flexagons, A Compendium and Guide. Springer. ISBN 978-90-481-2502-9.
- Sherman, Scott; Schwartz, Ann; Elran, Yossi (March 20, 2025). The Secret World of Flexagons. Milton: A K PETERS. ISBN 978-1-032-55383-2.
