= Raoul Bricard =

French mathematician and engineer

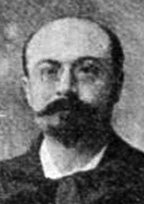
- Born: 23 March 1870
- Died: 26 November 1943 (aged 73)
- Scientific career
- Fields: Mathematics

Raoul Bricard (23 March 1870 – 26 November 1943) was a French engineer and a mathematician. He is best known for his work in geometry, especially descriptive geometry and scissors congruence, and kinematics, especially mechanical linkages.

== Biography ==
Bricard taught geometry at Ecole Centrale des Arts et Manufactures. In 1908 he became a professor of applied geometry at the National Conservatory of Arts and Crafts in Paris. In 1932 he received the Poncelet Prize in mathematics from the Paris Academy of Sciences for his work in geometry.

== Work ==
In 1896 Bricard published a paper on Hilbert's third problem, even before the problem was stated by Hilbert. In it he proved that mirror symmetric polytopes are scissors congruent, and proved a weak version of Dehn's criterion.

One of the Bricard octahedra

In 1897 Bricard published an important investigation on flexible polyhedra. In it he classified all flexible octahedra, now known as Bricard octahedra. This work was the subject of Henri Lebesgue's lectures in 1938. Later Bricard discovered notable 6-bar linkages.

Bricard also gave one of the first geometric proofs of Morley's trisector theorem in 1922.

== Books ==
Bricard authored six books, including a mathematics survey in Esperanto. He is listed in Encyclopedia of Esperanto.

- Matematika terminaro kaj krestomatio (in Esperanto), Hachette, Paris, 1905
- Géométrie descriptive, O. Doin et fils, 1911
- Cinématique et mécanismes, A. Colin, 1921
- Petit traité de perspective, Vuibert, 1924
- Leçons de cinématique, Gauthier-Villars et cie., 1926
- Le calcul vectoriel, A. Colin, 1929
