= Herbick & Held Printing Company =

- Industry: Printing
- Founded: 1903
- Founder: August Held, Nicholas Herbick
- Defunct: 1984
- Headquarters: Pittsburgh, Pennsylvania, United States

Herbick & Held Printing Company was an American high-end financial printer in Pittsburgh, Pennsylvania, that did business with many prominent companies such as US Steel, Mellon Bank and Gulf Oil, printing annual reports and other financial documents. It also printed many volumes for the University of Pittsburgh Press.

The company printed the baseball programs for the Pittsburgh Pirates for many years, including the 1960 World Series Program. A copy of this program exists in the Heinz museum on the north side of Pittsburgh. Another memorable printing job was for RCA. Several million copies of the insert for the "Sound of Music" album was printed in the late 1960s.

It was in business from 1903 to about 1984. It was founded by August Held (1861-1943), a German immigrant, and his partner, Nicholas Herbick. Herbick retired from the company in 1919. Held and his son, Bert, ran the company thereafter.

Its plant was located at 1117 Wolfendale Street, Pittsburgh.
