= Dahlander pole changing motor =

Type of multispeed three-phase induction motor

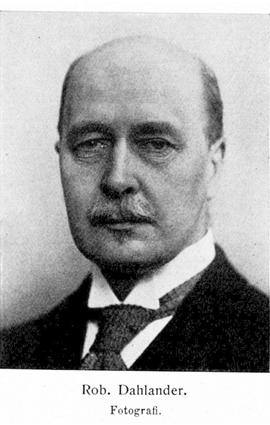
Robert Dahlander

A Dahlander motor (also known as a pole changing motor, dual- or two speed-motor) is a type of multispeed three-phase induction motor, in which the speed of the motor is varied by altering the number of poles; this is achieved by altering the wiring connections inside the motor. The motor may have fixed or variable torque depending on the stator winding. It is named after its inventor Robert Dahlander (1870–1935).

Dahlander motors are characterised by having six external connections to their stator windings. Although their use involves wye-delta switching (or 'star-delta'), this should not be confused with wye-delta starting that is also commonly used with large three-phase induction motors.

== Invention ==
Robert Dahlander, a Swedish engineer working for ASEA, discovered that switching the poles in a motor led to a reduction in the speed of the motor. In 1897 he invented an electrical configuration to switch between poles in a motor for which he was granted a patent along with his co-worker Karl Arvid Lindström. The new connection was named the "Dahlander connection" and a motor having such a configuration is commonly referred to as a "pole changing motor" or a "Dahlander motor".

== Operation ==
Dahlander motor wiring for low speed (delta connection) and high speed (double star connection)

The primary factor in determining the speed (Note: This is the synchronous speed. Practical motor designs run asynchronously, slightly slower than this, owing to slip.) of any induction motor is the number of poles, given by the formula

$n_s={120\times{f}\over{p}}$ (RPM)

where

$n_s$ = Synchronous speed, in revolutions per minute
$f$ = AC power frequency
$p$ = Number of poles per phase winding

A regular induction motor has an equal number of opposite poles; that is, at any instant, there are an equal number of North and South magnetic poles. Some smaller induction motors are connected so that all the poles are identical, causing the motor to act as though there is an equal number of opposite poles in between.

The Dahlander motor is based on a 'consequent pole' construction: the total number of poles of virtual poles expressed by the stator field is a combination of those with a winding directly around that pole, and the flux through the rest of the stator armature, giving rise to consequent poles in between them. With the Dahlander arrangement, the switching to the double wye connection reverses the direction of current flow in half of the windings. This is turn causes a halving of the number of poles expressed, as each pair of windings now acts as a single combined pole, rather than a pair of poles.

A Dahlander motor achieves different speeds by switching the configuration of the electrical windings, indirectly adding or removing poles and thus varying the rotor speed. The poles can be varied at a ratio of 1:2 and thus the speed can be varied at 2:1. Normally, the electrical configuration of windings is varied from a delta connection (Δ) to a double star connection (YY) configuration in order to change the speed of the motor for constant torque applications, such as the hoists in cranes. Star connections (Y) varied to double star connections (YY) are used for quadratic torque (Note: A 'quadratic torque' context is one where the torque required is proportional to the square of speed.) applications, such as pumps.

== Advantages and disadvantages ==
Dahlander motors have advantages compared to other speed control systems like variable frequency drives, as there is less power loss. This is because most of the power is used to drive the motor and no electrical pulse switching is done. The system is much simpler and easier to use compared to other speed control methods available. However, the Dahlander motor has the disadvantage of fast mechanical wear and tear due to changing speeds in such a drastic ratio; this type of connection also produces high harmonic distortion during the shifting of poles as the angular distance between the power generated increases as the poles are decreased in the motor.

== Application ==
Pole changing motors are normally used in applications where two speed controls are necessary. Some typical applications are:

- Pumps, wherein two speeds can be used to control the output flow
- Fans, to get variable air flow output
- Crushers
- Milling applications
- Cranes, where two speeds can be used in hoisting applications: one speed for material movement and the other for positioning the material held in the hoist

== See also ==
- AC motor
- Variable-speed air compressor
- Vector control (motor)
