= Flexible polyhedron =

3-dimensional geometric figure

In geometry, a flexible polyhedron is a polyhedral surface without any boundary edges, whose shape can be continuously changed while keeping the shapes of all of its faces unchanged. The Cauchy rigidity theorem shows that in dimension 3 such a polyhedron cannot be convex (this is also true in higher dimensions).

== Examples ==
One of Bricard's octahedra with an antiparallelogram as its equator

Steffen's polyhedron is the simplest possible non-self-crossing flexible polyhedron

Kaleidocycle, a flexible polyhedron that can twist continuously around an axis at the ring.

The first examples of flexible polyhedra were discovered by Raoul Bricard (1897), which are called Bricard octahedra. They are self-intersecting surfaces isometric to a regular octahedron. The first example of a flexible non-self-intersecting surface in three-dimensional Euclidean space $\mathbb{R}^3$, the Connelly sphere, was discovered by Robert Connelly (1977).

Steffen's polyhedron is another non-self-intersecting flexible polyhedron with nine vertices derived from Bricard's octahedra. The smallest number of vertices among any flexible polyhedra is eight, achieved by a polyhedron made by combining two Bricard octahedra to form a self-crossing flexible pentagonal bipyramid.

Kaleidocycle or (flextangle) is another example of a flexible polyhedron, constructed by connecting six tetragonal disphenoids on opposite edges into a cycle. This polyhedron can twist continuously around an axis at the ring.

== Bellows conjecture ==
In the late 1970s Connelly and D. Sullivan formulated the bellows conjecture stating that the volume of a flexible polyhedron is invariant under flexing. This conjecture was proved for polyhedra homeomorphic to a sphere by I. Kh. Sabitov (1995) using elimination theory, and then proved for general orientable 2-dimensional polyhedral surfaces by Robert Connelly, I. Sabitov, and Anke Walz (1997). The proof extends Piero della Francesca's formula for the volume of a tetrahedron to a formula for the volume of any polyhedron. The extended formula shows that the volume must be a root of a polynomial whose coefficients depend only on the lengths of the polyhedron's edges. Since the edge lengths cannot change as the polyhedron flexes, the volume must remain at one of the finitely many roots of the polynomial, rather than changing continuously.

== Scissor congruence ==
Connelly conjectured that the Dehn invariant of a flexible polyhedron is invariant under flexing. This was known as the strong bellows conjecture or (after it was proven in 2018) the strong bellows theorem. Because all configurations of a flexible polyhedron have both the same volume and the same Dehn invariant, they are scissors congruent to each other, meaning that for any two of these configurations it is possible to dissect one of them into polyhedral pieces that can be reassembled to form the other. The total mean curvature of a flexible polyhedron, defined as the sum of the products of edge lengths with exterior dihedral angles, is a function of the Dehn invariant that is also known to stay constant while a polyhedron flexes.

== Generalizations ==
Flexible 4-polytopes in 4-dimensional Euclidean space and 3-dimensional hyperbolic space were studied by Hellmuth Stachel (2000). In dimensions $n\geq 5$, flexible polytopes were constructed by Gaifullin (2014).

== See also ==
- Flexagon
- Kokotsakis polyhedron
- Rigid origami
