= Robert Connelly =

American mathematician

- Education: University of Michigan
- Scientific career
- Workplaces: Cornell University (current),
- Thesis: Unknotting Close Embeddings of Polyhedra in Codimension Greater Than Three (1969)
- Doctoral advisor: James Milton Kister
- Website: pi.math.cornell.edu/~connelly/

Robert Connelly (born July 15, 1942) is a mathematician specializing in discrete geometry and rigidity theory. Connelly received his Ph.D. from University of Michigan in 1969. He is currently a professor at Cornell University.

Connelly is best known for discovering embedded flexible polyhedra. One such polyhedron is in the National Museum of American History. His recent interests include tensegrities and the carpenter's rule problem. In 2012 he became a fellow of the American Mathematical Society.

Asteroid 4816 Connelly, discovered by Edward Bowell at Lowell Observatory 1981, was named after Robert Connelly. The official naming citation was published by the Minor Planet Center on 18 February 1992 (M.P.C. 19698).

== Author ==
Connelly has authored or co-authored several articles on mathematics, including Conjectures and open questions in rigidity; A flexible sphere; and A counterexample to the rigidity conjecture for polyhedra.
