= Wallace–Bolyai–Gerwien theorem =

Theorem on polygon dissections

By the Wallace–Bolyai–Gerwien theorem, a square can be cut into parts and rearranged into a triangle of equal area.

In geometry, the Wallace–Bolyai–Gerwien theorem, named after William Wallace, Farkas Bolyai and P. Gerwien, is a theorem related to dissections of polygons. It answers the question of whether one polygon can be formed from another by cutting it into a finite number of pieces and recomposing these by translations and rotations. The Wallace–Bolyai–Gerwien theorem states that this can be done if and only if two polygons have the same area.

Wallace had proven the same result already in 1807.

According to other sources, Bolyai and Gerwien had independently proved the theorem in 1833 and 1835, respectively.

== Formulation ==
There are several ways in which this theorem may be formulated. The most common version uses the concept of "equidecomposability" of polygons: two polygons are equidecomposable if they can be split into finitely many triangles that only differ by some isometry (in fact only by a combination of a translation and a rotation). In this case the Wallace–Bolyai–Gerwien theorem states that two polygons are equidecomposable if and only if they have the same area.

Another formulation is in terms of scissors congruence: two polygons are scissors-congruent if they can be decomposed into finitely many polygons that are pairwise congruent. Scissors-congruence is an equivalence relation. In this case the Wallace–Bolyai–Gerwien theorem states that the equivalence classes of this relation contain precisely those polygons that have the same area.

== Proof sketch ==
The theorem can be understood in a few steps. Firstly, every polygon can be cut into triangles. There are a few methods for this. For convex polygons one can cut off each vertex in turn, while for concave polygons this requires more care. A general approach that works for non-simple polygons as well would be to choose a line not parallel to any of the sides of the polygon and draw a line parallel to this one through each of the vertices of the polygon. This will divide the polygon into triangles and trapezoids, which in turn can be converted into triangles.

Secondly, each of these triangles can be transformed into a right triangle and subsequently into a rectangle with one side of length 1. Alternatively, a triangle can be transformed into one such rectangle by first turning it into a parallelogram and then turning this into such a rectangle. By doing this for each triangle, the polygon can be decomposed into a rectangle with unit width and height equal to its area.

Since this can be done for any two polygons, a "common subdivision" of the rectangle in between proves the theorem. That is, cutting the common rectangle (of size 1 by its area) according to both polygons will be an intermediate between both polygons.

== Notes about the proof ==
First of all, this proof requires an intermediate polygon. In the formulation of the theorem using scissors-congruence, the use of this intermediate can be reformulated by using the fact that scissor-congruences are transitive. Since both the first polygon and the second polygon are scissors-congruent to the intermediate, they are scissors-congruent to one another.

The proof of this theorem is constructive and doesn't require the axiom of choice, even though some other dissection problems (e.g. Tarski's circle-squaring problem) do need it. In this case, the decomposition and reassembly can actually be carried out "physically": the pieces can, in theory, be cut with scissors from paper and reassembled by hand.

Nonetheless, the number of pieces required to compose one polygon from another using this procedure generally far exceeds the minimum number of polygons needed.

== Degree of decomposability ==
Consider two equidecomposable polygons P and Q. The minimum number n of pieces required to compose one polygon Q from another polygon P is denoted by σ(P,Q).

Depending on the polygons, it is possible to estimate upper and lower bounds for σ(P,Q). For instance, Alfred Tarski proved that if P is convex and the diameters of P and Q are respectively given by d(P) and d(Q), then

$$\sigma(P,Q) \ge \frac{d(P)}{d(Q)}.$$

If P_{x} is a rectangle of sides a · x and a · (1/x) and Q is a square of side length a, then P_{x} and Q are equidecomposable for every x > 0. An upper bound for σ(P_{x},Q) is given by

$$\sigma(P_x,Q) \le 2 + \left\lceil \sqrt{x^2 - 1} \right\rceil, \quad\text{for } x \ge 1.$$

Since σ(P_{x},Q) = σ(P_{(1/x)},Q), we also have that

$$\sigma\left(P_\frac{1}{x},Q\right) \le 2 + \left\lceil \frac{\sqrt{1-x^2}}{x} \right\rceil, \quad\text{for } x \le 1.$$

== Generalisations ==
The analogous statement about polyhedra in three dimensions, known as Hilbert's third problem, is false, as proven by Max Dehn in 1900. The problem has also been considered in some non-Euclidean geometries. In two-dimensional hyperbolic and spherical geometry, the theorem holds. However, the problem is still open for these geometries in three dimensions.
