= Polyhedron =

Flat-sided three-dimensional shape

Examples of polyhedra
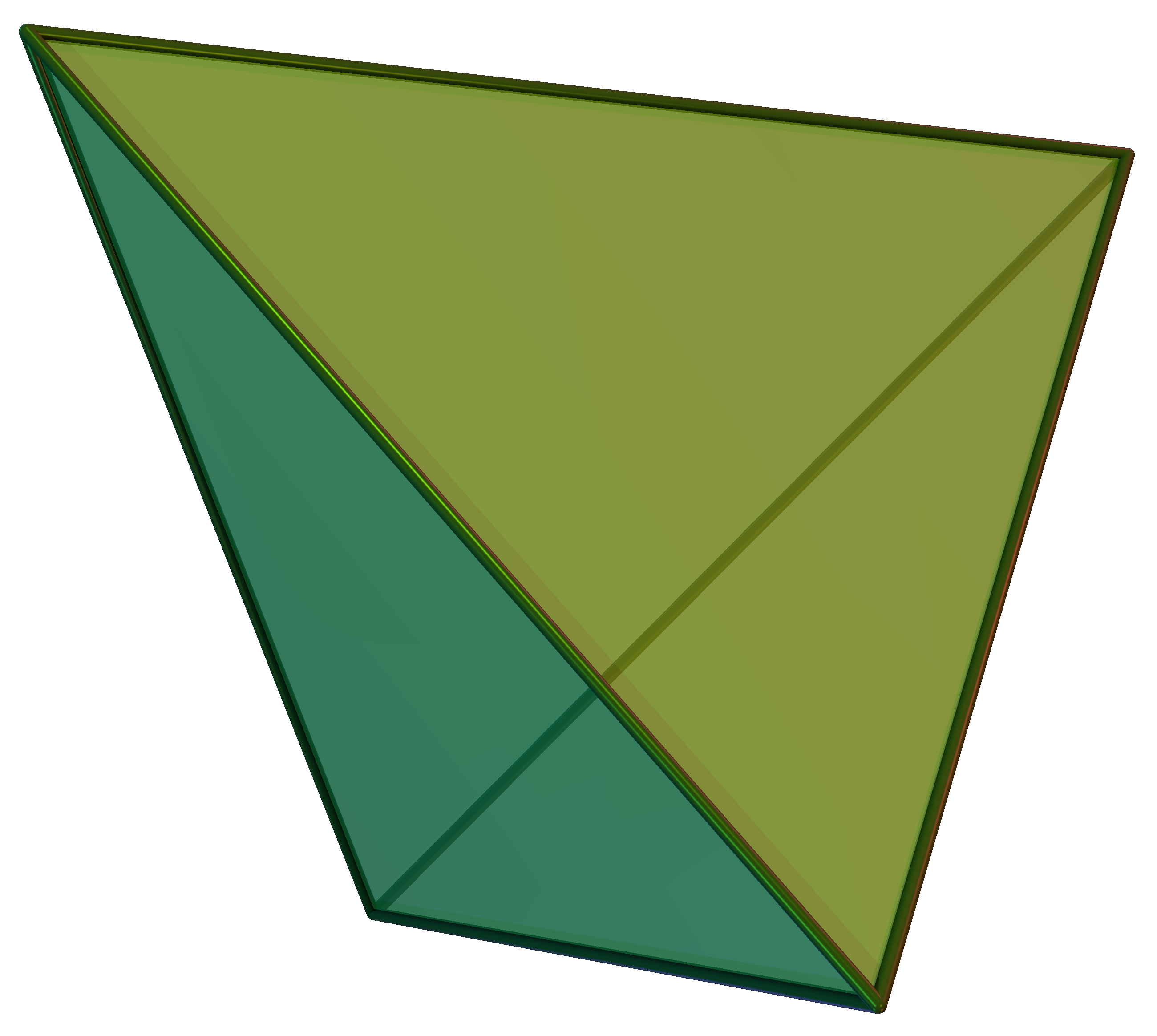
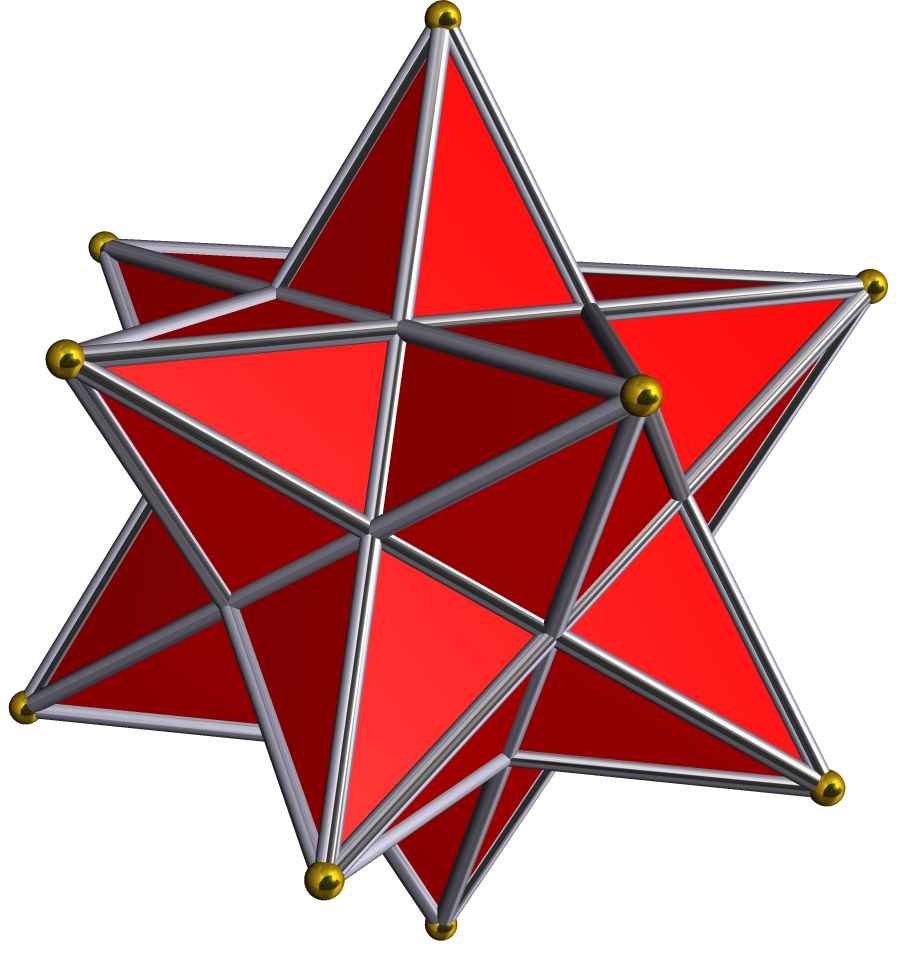
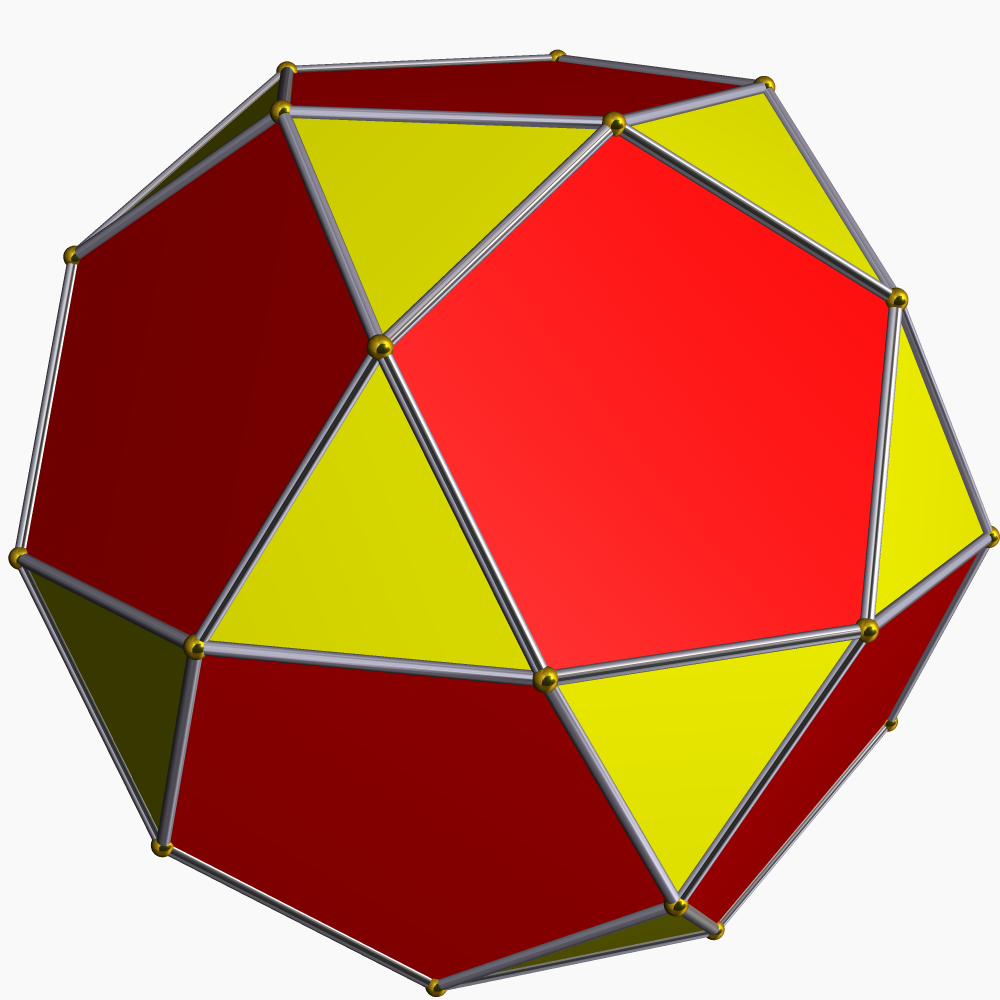
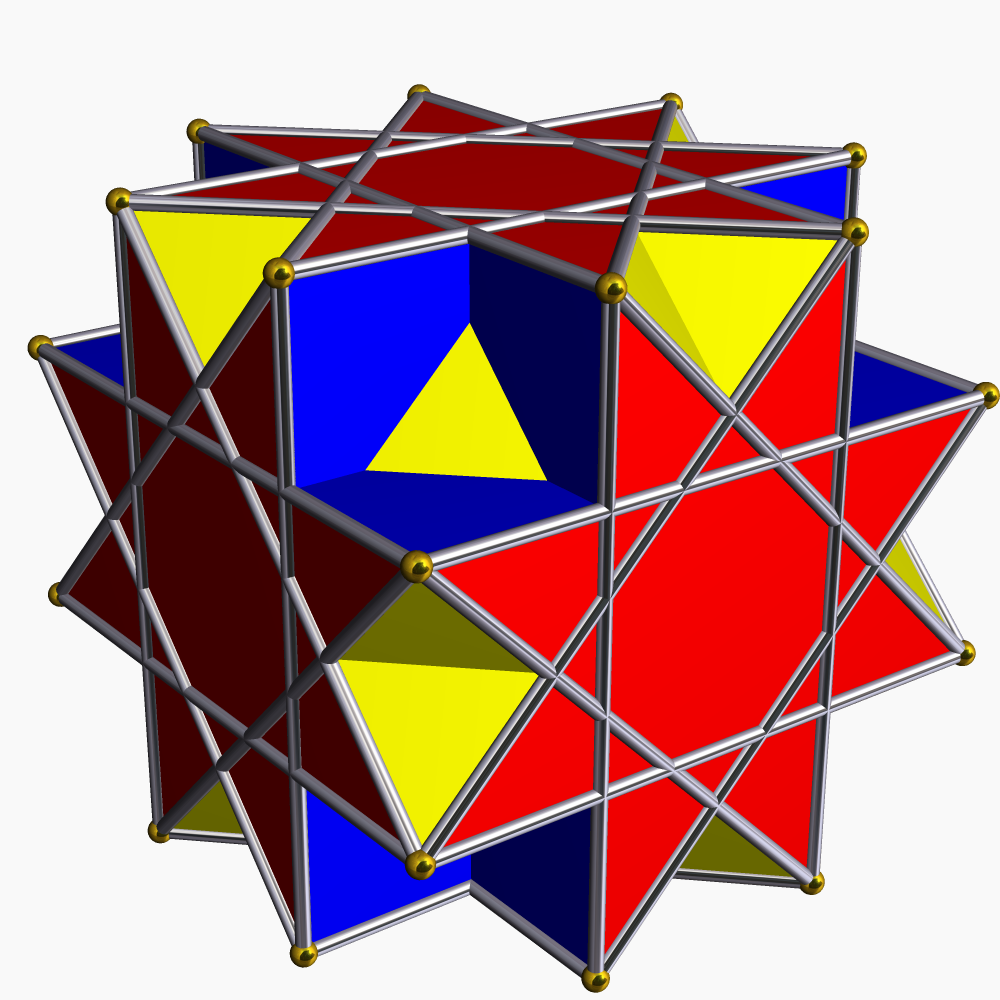
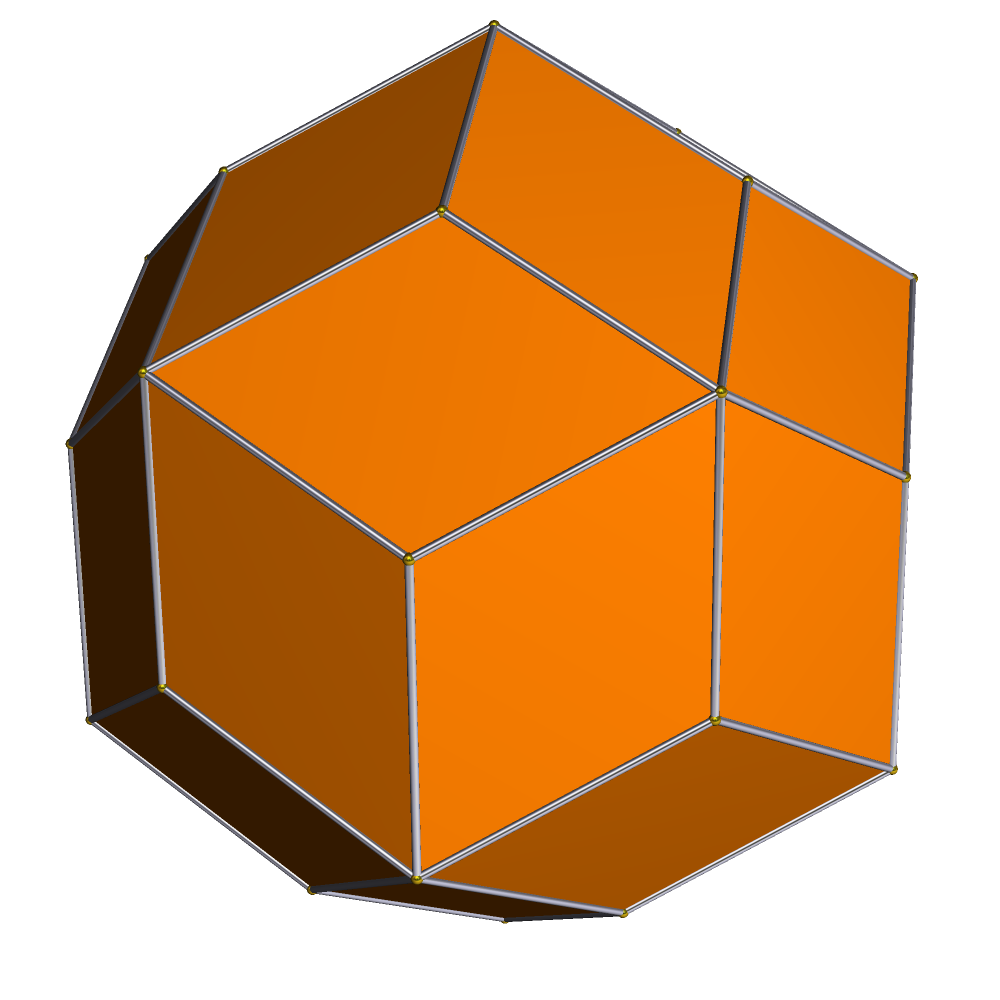
- Regular tetrahedron (Platonic solid) Small stellated dodecahedron (Kepler–Poinsot polyhedron) Icosidodecahedron (Archimedean solid) Great cubicuboctahedron (Uniform star-polyhedron) Rhombic triacontahedron (Catalan solid) A toroidal polyhedron
- Definition: A three-dimensional example of the more general polytope in any number of dimensions.
- Characteristics: number of faces, topological classification and Euler characteristic, duality, vertex figures, surface area and volume, lines as in geodesics and diagonals, Dehn invariant, symmetry group.

In geometry, a polyhedron (pl.: polyhedra or polyhedrons; from Greek πολύ (poly-) 'many' and ἕδρον (-hedron) 'base, seat') is a three-dimensional figure with flat polygonal faces, straight edges and sharp corners or vertices. The term "polyhedron" may refer either to a solid figure or to its boundary surface. The terms solid polyhedron and polyhedral surface are commonly used to distinguish the two concepts. Also, the term polyhedron is often used to refer implicitly to the whole structure formed by a solid polyhedron, its polyhedral surface, its faces, its edges, and its vertices.

There are many definitions of polyhedra, not all of which are equivalent. Under any definition, polyhedra are typically understood to generalize two-dimensional polygons and to be the three-dimensional specialization of polytopes (a more general concept in any number of dimensions). Polyhedra have several general characteristics that include the number of faces, topological classification by Euler characteristic, duality, vertex figures, surface area, volume, interior lines, Dehn invariant, and symmetry. A symmetry of a polyhedron means that the polyhedron's appearance is unchanged by a transformation, such as rotating and reflecting.

Convex polyhedra are a well-defined class of polyhedra with several equivalent standard definitions. Every convex polyhedron is the convex hull of its vertices, and the convex hull of a finite set of points is a polyhedron. Many common families of convex polyhedra, with cubes and pyramids are familiar examples of such.

There exist many miscellaneous families of polyhedra. Space-filling polyhedra are those that can be packed together with copies of themselves or with other different types of polyhedra in three-dimensional space. Flexible polyhedra are the polyhedra that can change their overall shape while preserving the shapes of their faces; some have such. Ideal polyhedron is a convex polyhedron defined in three-dimensional hyperbolic space. Lattice polyhedra are the convex polyhedra that can be constructed with integers coordinates. Orthogonal polyhedra are polyhedra where all edges are orthogonal, parallel to all three axes of Cartesian coordinate system. Copies of polyhedra can share a centre, which is known as polyhedral compounds. Polyhedra can be generalized into infinitely many faces called apeirohedra, the underlying space of which is a complex Hilbert space known as complex polyhedra, as well as allowing curved faces and edges.

The origin of polyhedra dates back to the ancient era. Ancient Egypt's four-sided Egyptian pyramids are known for the pyramidal structure, with the study of calculating their volume, specifically the volume of a frustum, in Moscow Mathematical Papyrus. In Ancient Greek, the Etruscan dodecahedron was discovered at Etruscan civilization made of soapstone on Monte Loffa, and Platonic solids were discovered and studied by Ancient Greek mathematicians, with Plato describes its association to the natures for each in his Timaeus, later soon treatment studied in Euclid's Elements. In Renaissance, toroidal polyhedra were used for sketching on polyhedral's perspective views, skeletal models, and nets appearance. Leonhard Euler worked on the polyhedral characteristics and the solution for the Seven Bridges of Königsberg's problem, underlying the field of topology. Johannes Kepler discovered two non-convex regular polyhedra, extended by Louis Poinsot prepending two more remaining polyhedra, known as Kepler–Poinsot polyhedra. Many results on polyhedral concepts, like Hilbert's third problem, Steinitz's theorem, and stellation of Platonic solids. Polyhedra are used in many fields, as well as appearing in biological creatures, nature, and modern computational geometry.

== Definition ==
The Original Sin in the theory of polyhedra goes back to Euclid, and through Kepler, Poinsot, Cauchy and many others ... at each stage ... the writers failed to define what are the polyhedra.

— Branko Grünbaum

There are several standard definitions of convex polyhedra, but except for certain degenerate cases they are equivalent, so the notion of convex polyhedra is agreed upon. In contrast, for the definition of polyhedra in general, no universal agreement exists, and many works about polyhedra use intuitive notions that are never formalized.

Inequivalent definitions of "polyhedron" have been given in different contexts. Some of these definitions exclude shapes that have often been counted as polyhedra (such as the self-crossing polyhedra) or include shapes that are often not considered as valid polyhedra (such as solids whose boundaries are not manifolds). And although several of these definitions explicitly require the number of faces of a polyhedron to be finite, shapes with infinitely many faces such as the skew apeirohedra have also been called polyhedra. Nevertheless, there is general agreement that a polyhedron is a solid or surface that can be described by its vertices (corner points), edges (line segments connecting certain pairs of vertices), faces (two-dimensional polygons), and that it sometimes can be said to have a particular three-dimensional interior volume. One can distinguish among these different definitions according to whether they describe the polyhedron as a solid, whether they describe it as a surface, or whether they describe it more abstractly based on its incidence geometry.

Two polycubes (unions of finitely many unit cubes) whose boundary can be covered by finitely many planes but that do not meet some of the more restrictive definitions of polyhedra: The solid on the left has a face that is not a simple polygon, and the solid on the right has a pair of faces that meet in more than one edge.

- A common and somewhat naive definition of a polyhedron is that it is a solid whose boundary can be covered by finitely many planes or that it is a solid formed as the union of finitely many convex polyhedra. Natural refinements of this definition require the solid to be bounded, to have a connected interior, and possibly also to have a connected boundary. The faces of such a polyhedron can be defined as the connected components of the parts of the boundary within each of the planes that cover it, and the edges and vertices as the line segments and points where the faces meet. However, the polyhedra defined in this way do not include the self-crossing star polyhedra, whose faces may not form simple polygons, and some of whose edges may belong to more than two faces.
- Definitions based on the idea of a bounding surface rather than a solid are also common. For instance, O'Rourke (1993) defines a polyhedron as a union of finitely many convex polygons (its faces), arranged in space so that the intersection of any two polygons is a shared vertex or edge or the empty set and so that their union is a manifold. If a planar part of such a surface is not itself a convex polygon, O'Rourke requires it to be subdivided into smaller convex polygons, with flat dihedral angles between them. Somewhat more generally, Grünbaum defines an acoptic polyhedron to be a collection of finitely many simple polygons that form an embedded manifold, with each vertex incident to at least three edges and each two faces intersecting only in shared vertices and edges of each. Cromwell's Polyhedra gives a similar definition but without the restriction of at least three edges per vertex. Again, this type of definition does not encompass the self-crossing polyhedra. Similar notions form the basis of topological definitions of polyhedra, as subdivisions of a topological manifold into topological disks (the faces) whose pairwise intersections are required to be points (vertices), topological arcs (edges), or the empty set. However, there exist topological polyhedra (even with all faces triangles) that cannot be realized as acoptic polyhedra.

A square pyramid and the associated abstract polytope, a partially ordered set of its elements.

- One modern approach is based on the theory of abstract polyhedra. These can be defined as partially ordered sets whose elements are the vertices, edges, and faces of a polyhedron. A vertex or edge element is less than an edge or face element (in this partial order) when the vertex or edge is part of the edge or face. Additionally, one may include a special bottom element of this partial order (representing the empty set) and a top element representing the whole polyhedron. If the sections of the partial order between elements three levels apart (that is, between each face and the bottom element, and between the top element and each vertex) have the same structure as the abstract representation of a polygon, then these partially ordered sets carry exactly the same information as a topological polyhedron. However, these requirements are often relaxed, to instead require only that sections between elements two levels apart have the same structure as the abstract representation of a line segment. (This means that each edge contains two vertices and belongs to two faces, and that each vertex on a face belongs to two edges of that face.) Geometric polyhedra, defined in other ways, can be described abstractly in this way, but it is also possible to use abstract polyhedra as the basis of a definition of geometric polyhedra. A realization of an abstract polyhedron is generally taken to be a mapping from the vertices of the abstract polyhedron to geometric points, such that the points of each face are coplanar. A geometric polyhedron can then be defined as a realization of an abstract polyhedron. Realizations that omit the requirement of face planarity, that impose additional requirements of symmetry, or that map the vertices to higher dimensional spaces have also been considered. Unlike the solid-based and surface-based definitions, this works perfectly well for star polyhedra. However, without additional restrictions, this definition allows degenerate or unfaithful polyhedra (for instance, by mapping all vertices to a single point) and the question of how to constrain realizations to avoid these degeneracies has not been settled.

In all of these definitions, a polyhedron is typically understood as a three-dimensional example of the more general polytope in any number of dimensions. For example, a polygon has a two-dimensional body and no faces, while a 4-polytope has a four-dimensional body and an additional set of three-dimensional "cells". However, some of the literature on higher-dimensional geometry uses the term "polyhedron" to mean something else: not a three-dimensional polytope, but a shape that is different from a polytope in some way. For instance, some sources define a convex polyhedron to be the intersection of finitely many half-spaces, and a polytope to be a bounded polyhedron. The remainder of this article considers only three-dimensional polyhedra.

== General characteristics ==
=== Number of faces ===
Polyhedra may be classified and are often named according to the number of faces. The naming system is based on Classical Greek, and combines a prefix counting the faces with the suffix "hedron", meaning "base" or "seat" and referring to the faces. For example a tetrahedron is a polyhedron with four faces, a pentahedron is a polyhedron with five faces, a hexahedron is a polyhedron with six faces, etc. For a complete list of the Greek numeral prefixes see Numeral prefix § Table of number prefixes in English, in the column for Greek cardinal numbers. The names of tetrahedra, hexahedra, octahedra (eight-sided polyhedra), dodecahedra (twelve-sided polyhedra), and icosahedra (twenty-sided polyhedra) are sometimes used without additional qualification to refer to the Platonic solids, and sometimes used to refer more generally to polyhedra with the given number of sides without any assumption of symmetry.

=== Topological classification ===
The tetrahemihexahedron, a non-orientable self-intersecting polyhedron with four triangular faces (red) and three square faces (yellow). As with a Möbius strip or Klein bottle, a continuous path along the surface of this polyhedron can reach the point on the opposite side of the surface from its starting point, making it impossible to separate the surface into an inside and an outside. (Topologically, this polyhedron is a real projective plane.)

Some polyhedra have two distinct sides to their surface. For example, the inside and outside of a convex polyhedron paper model can each be given a different colour (although the inside colour will be hidden from view). These polyhedra are orientable. The same is true for non-convex polyhedra without self-crossings. Some non-convex self-crossing polyhedra can be coloured in the same way but have regions turned "inside out" so that both colours appear on the outside in different places; these are still considered to be orientable. However, for some other self-crossing polyhedra with simple-polygon faces, such as the tetrahemihexahedron, it is not possible to colour the two sides of each face with two different colours so that adjacent faces have consistent colours. In this case the polyhedron is said to be non-orientable. For polyhedra with self-crossing faces, it may not be clear what it means for adjacent faces to be consistently coloured, but for these polyhedra it is still possible to determine whether it is orientable or non-orientable by considering a topological cell complex with the same incidences between its vertices, edges, and faces.

A more subtle distinction between polyhedron surfaces is given by their Euler characteristic, which combines the numbers of vertices $V$, edges $E$, and faces $F$ of a polyhedron into a single number $\chi$ defined by the formula

$$\chi=V-E+F.\$$

The same formula is also used for the Euler characteristic of other kinds of topological surfaces. It is an invariant of the surface, meaning that when a single surface is subdivided into vertices, edges, and faces in more than one way, the Euler characteristic will be the same for these subdivisions. For a convex polyhedron, or more generally any simply connected polyhedron with the surface of a topological sphere, it always equals 2. For more complicated shapes, the Euler characteristic relates to the number of toroidal holes, handles or cross-caps in the surface and will be less than 2. All polyhedra with odd-numbered Euler characteristics are non-orientable. A given figure with even Euler characteristic may or may not be orientable. For example, the one-holed toroid and the Klein bottle both have $\chi = 0$, with the first being orientable and the other not.

For many (but not all) ways of defining polyhedra, the surface of the polyhedron is required to be a manifold. This means that every edge is part of the boundary of exactly two faces (disallowing shapes like the union of two cubes that meet only along a shared edge) and that every vertex is incident to a single alternating cycle of edges and faces (disallowing shapes like the union of two cubes sharing only a single vertex). For polyhedra defined in these ways, the classification of manifolds implies that the topological type of the surface is completely determined by the combination of its Euler characteristic and orientability. For example, every polyhedron whose surface is an orientable manifold and whose Euler characteristic is 2 must be a topological sphere.

A toroidal polyhedron is a polyhedron whose Euler characteristic is less than or equal to 0, or equivalently whose genus is 1 or greater. Topologically, the surfaces of such polyhedra are torus surfaces having one or more holes through the middle. A notable example is the Szilassi polyhedron, which geometrically realizes the Heawood map. A polyhedron with the symmetries of a regular polyhedron and with genus more than one is a Leonardo polyhedron.

=== Duality ===
The octahedron is dual to the cube

For every convex polyhedron, there exists a dual polyhedron having

- faces in place of the original's vertices and vice versa, and
- the same number of edges.

The dual of a convex polyhedron can be obtained by the process of polar reciprocation. Dual polyhedra exist in pairs, and the dual of a dual is just the original polyhedron again. Some polyhedra are self-dual, meaning that the dual of the polyhedron is congruent to the original polyhedron. However, unlike polar reciprocation, it is possible that a self-duality might not be an involution, meaning that repeating the self-duality twice might not return each vertex and face of the polyhedron to its original position.

Abstract polyhedra also have duals, obtained by reversing the partial order defining the polyhedron to obtain its dual or opposite order. These have the same Euler characteristic and orientability as the initial polyhedron. However, this form of duality does not describe the shape of a dual polyhedron, but only its combinatorial structure. For some definitions of non-convex geometric polyhedra, there exist polyhedra whose abstract duals cannot be realized as geometric polyhedra under the same definition.

=== Vertex figures ===
For every vertex one can define a vertex figure, which describes the local structure of the polyhedron around the vertex. Precise definitions vary, but a vertex figure can be thought of as the polygon exposed where a slice through the polyhedron cuts off a vertex. For the Platonic solids and other highly-symmetric polyhedra, this slice may be chosen to pass through the midpoints of each edge incident to the vertex, but other polyhedra may not have a plane through these points. For convex polyhedra, and more generally for polyhedra whose vertices are in convex position, this slice can be chosen as any plane separating the vertex from the other vertices. When the polyhedron has a center of symmetry, it is standard to choose this plane to be perpendicular to the line through the given vertex and the center; with this choice, the shape of the vertex figure is determined up to scaling. When the vertices of a polyhedron are not in convex position, there will not always be a plane separating each vertex from the rest. In this case, it is common instead to slice the polyhedron by a small sphere centered at the vertex. Again, this produces a shape for the vertex figure that is invariant up to scaling. All of these choices lead to vertex figures with the same combinatorial structure, for the polyhedra to which they can be applied, but they may give them different geometric shapes.

=== Surface area and lines inside polyhedra ===
The surface area of a polyhedron is the sum of the areas of its faces, for definitions of polyhedra for which the area of a face is well-defined. The geodesic distance between any two points on the surface of a polyhedron measures the length of the shortest curve that connects the two points, remaining within the surface. By Alexandrov's uniqueness theorem, every convex polyhedron is uniquely determined by the metric space of geodesic distances on its surface. However, non-convex polyhedra can have the same surface distances as each other, or the same as certain convex polyhedra.

When a line segment connect two vertices that are not in the same face, it forms a diagonal line of the polyhedron. Not all polyhedra have diagonal lines, as in the family of pyramids. The Schönhardt polyhedron has three diagonal lines, all of which lie entirely outside of it, and the Császár polyhedron has no diagonal lines (rather, every pair of vertices is connected by an edge).

=== Volume ===
Polyhedral solids have an associated quantity called volume that measures how much space they occupy. Simple families of solids may have simple formulas for their volumes; for example, the volumes of pyramids, prisms, and parallelepipeds can easily be expressed in terms of their edge lengths or other coordinates. (See Volume § Volume formulas for a list that includes many of these formulas.)

Volumes of more complicated polyhedra may not have simple formulas. The volumes of such polyhedra may be computed by subdividing the polyhedron into smaller pieces (for example, by triangulation). For example, the volume of a Platonic solid can be computed by dividing it into congruent pyramids, with each pyramid having a face of the polyhedron as its base and the centre of the polyhedron as its apex.

In general, it can be derived from the divergence theorem that the volume of a polyhedral solid is given by
$$\frac{1}{3} \left| \sum_F (Q_F \cdot N_F) \operatorname{area}(F) \right|,$$
where the sum is over faces $F$ of the polyhedron, $Q_F$ is an arbitrary point on face $F$, $N_F$ is the unit vector perpendicular to $F$ pointing outside the solid, and the multiplication dot is the dot product. In higher dimensions, volume computation may be challenging, in part because of the difficulty of listing the faces of a convex polyhedron specified only by its vertices, and there exist specialized algorithms to determine the volume in these cases.

=== Dehn invariant ===
In two dimensions, the Bolyai–Gerwien theorem asserts that any polygon may be transformed into any other polygon of the same area by cutting it up into finitely many polygonal pieces and rearranging them. The analogous question for polyhedra was the subject of Hilbert's third problem. Max Dehn solved this problem by showing that, unlike in the 2-D case, there exist polyhedra of the same volume that cannot be cut into smaller polyhedra and reassembled into each other. To prove this Dehn discovered another value associated with a polyhedron, the Dehn invariant, such that two polyhedra can only be dissected into each other when they have the same volume and the same Dehn invariant. It was later proven by Sydler that this is the only obstacle to dissection: every two Euclidean polyhedra with the same volumes and Dehn invariants can be cut up and reassembled into each other. The Dehn invariant is not a number, but a vector in an infinite-dimensional vector space, determined from the lengths and dihedral angles of a polyhedron's edges.

Another of Hilbert's problems, Hilbert's eighteenth problem, concerns (among other things) polyhedra that tile space. Every such polyhedron must have Dehn invariant zero. The Dehn invariant has also been connected to flexible polyhedra by the strong bellows theorem, which states that the Dehn invariant of any flexible polyhedron remains invariant as it flexes.

=== Net ===
A net of a regular dodecahedron

The faces of some polyhedra can be unfolded into an arrangement of non-overlapping edge-joined polygons in the plane. Such an arrangement is known as a net of the polyhedron. Nets can be used to construct polyhedron models from paper or other flexible materials.

== Symmetries ==
Some polyhedra rotating around a symmetrical axis (at Matemateca IME-USP)

Many of the most studied polyhedra are highly symmetrical. Their appearance is unchanged by some reflection by plane or rotation around the axes passing through two opposite vertices, edges, or faces in space. Each symmetry may change the location of a given element, but the set of all vertices (likewise faces and edges) is unchanged. The collection of symmetries of a polyhedron is called its symmetry group.

=== By elements of polyhedron ===
All the elements (vertex, face, and edge) that can be superimposed on each other by symmetries are said to form a symmetry orbit. If these elements lie in the same orbit, the figure may be transitive on the orbit. Individually, they are isohedral (or face-transitive, meaning the symmetry transformations involve the polyhedra's faces in orbit), (Note: The topological property of an isohedral polyhedra can be represented by a face configuration. All five Platonic solids and thirteen Catalan solids are isohedra, as well as the infinite families of trapezohedra and bipyramids. Some definitions of isohedra allow geometric variations including concave and self-intersecting forms.) isotoxal (or edge-transitive, which involves the edge's polyhedra), and isogonal (or vertex-transitive, which involves the polyhedra's vertices). For example, the cube in which all the faces are in one orbit and involving the rotation and reflections in the orbit remains unchanged in its appearance; hence, the cube is face-transitive. The cube also has the other two such symmetries.

The cube is a regular polyhedron, because its faces, edges, and vertices are transitive to another, and the appearance is unchanged.

When three such symmetries belong to a polyhedron, it is known as a regular polyhedron. There are nine regular polyhedra: five Platonic solids (cube, octahedron, icosahedron, tetrahedron, and dodecahedron—all of which have regular polygonal faces) and four Kepler–Poinsot polyhedrons. Nevertheless, some polyhedrons may not possess one or two of those symmetries:

- A polyhedron that is vertex-transitive and edge-transitive is said to be quasiregular; they have regular faces, and their duals are face-transitive and edge-transitive.
- A vertex- but not edge-transitive polyhedron with regular polygonal faces is said to be semiregular. (Note: This is one of several definitions of the term, depending on the author. Some definitions overlap with the quasi-regular class.) This includes the prisms and antiprisms. The dual of a semiregular polyhedron is face-transitive, and every vertex is regular.
- A vertex-transitive polyhedron with regular polygonal faces is said to be uniform. This class includes the regular, quasi-regular, and semi-regular polyhedra. The definition may be applied to both convex and star polyhedra. The dual of a uniform polyhedron is face-transitive and has regular vertices but is not necessarily vertex-transitive. The uniform polyhedra and their duals are traditionally classified according to their degree of symmetry, and whether they are convex or not.
- A face- and vertex-transitive (but not necessarily edge-transitive) polyhedron is said to be noble. The regular polyhedra are also noble; they are the only noble uniform polyhedra. The duals of noble polyhedra are themselves noble.

Some polyhedra have no reflection symmetry, so that they have two enantiomorph forms, which are reflections of each other. Examples include the snub cuboctahedron and snub icosidodecahedron. In this case the polyhedron is said to be chiral.

=== By point group in three dimensions ===
The point group of polyhedra means a mathematical group endowed with its symmetry operations so that the appearance of polyhedra remains preserved while transforming in three-dimensional space. The indicated transformation here includes the rotation around the axes, reflection through the plane, inversion through a center point, and a combination of these three.

The regular tetrahedron has full tetrahedral symmetry: three-fold rotation around axis passing both vertex and triangular face, and two-fold rotation around axis through two edges, as well as the reflection plane through two faces and one edge

The polyhedral group is the symmetry group originally derived from the three Platonic solids: tetrahedron, octahedron, and icosahedron. These three have point groups respectively known as tetrahedral symmetry, octahedral symmetry, and icosahedral symmetry. Each of these focuses on the rotation group of polyhedra, known as the chiral polyhedral group, whereas the additional reflection symmetry is known as the full polyhedral group. One point group, pyritohedral symmetry, includes the rotation of tetrahedral symmetry and additionally has three planes of reflection symmetry and some rotoreflections. Overall, the mentioned polyhedral groups are summarized in the following bullets:

- chiral tetrahedral symmetry $\mathrm{T}$, the rotation group for a regular tetrahedron and has the order of twelve.
- full tetrahedral symmetry $\mathrm{T}_\mathrm{d}$, the symmetry group for a regular tetrahedron and has the order of twenty-four.
- pyritohedral symmetry $\mathrm{T}_\mathrm{h}$, the symmetry of a pyritohedron and has the order of twenty-four.
- chiral octahedral symmetry $\mathrm{O}$, the rotation group of both cube and regular octahedron and has the order twenty-four.
- full octahedral symmetry $\mathrm{O}_\mathrm{h}$, the symmetry group of both cube and regular octahedron and has order forty-eight.
- chiral icosahedral symmetry $\mathrm{I}$, the rotation group of both regular icosahedron and regular dodecahedron and has the order of sixty.
- full icosahedral symmetry $\mathrm{I}_\mathrm{h}$, the symmetry group of both regular icosahedron and regular dodecahedron and has the order of a hundred-twenty.

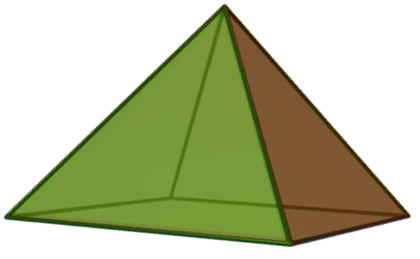
The square pyramid has pyramidal symmetry $C_{4\mathrm{v}}$. It shows the appearance is invariant by rotating every quarter of a full turn around its axis and possesses mirror symmetric relative to any perpendicular plane passing through its base's bisector

Point groups in three dimensions may also allow the preservation of polyhedra's appearance by the circulation around an axis. There are three various of these point groups:

- pyramidal symmetry $C_{n \mathrm{v}}$, allowing rotate the axis passing through the apex and its base, as well as reflection relative to perpendicular planes passing through the bisector of a base. This point group symmetry can be found in pyramids, cupolas, and rotundas.
- prismatic symmetry $D_{n\mathrm{h}}$, similar to the pyramidal symmetry, but with additional transformation by reflecting it across a horizontal plane. This may be achieved from the family of prisms and its dual bipyramids.
- antiprismatic symmetry $D_{n \mathrm{v}}$, which preserves the symmetry by rotating its half bottom and reflection across the horizontal plane. Examples can be found in antiprisms.

A point group $C_{n \mathrm{h}}$ consists of rotating around the axis of symmetry and reflection on the horizontal plane. In the case of $n = 1$, the symmetry group only preserves the symmetry by a full rotation solely, ordinarily denoting $C_s$. Polyhedra may have rotation only to preserve the symmetry, and the symmetry group may be considered as the cyclic group $C_n$. Polyhedra with the rotoreflection and the rotation by the cyclic group is the point group $S_n$.

== Convex polyhedra ==
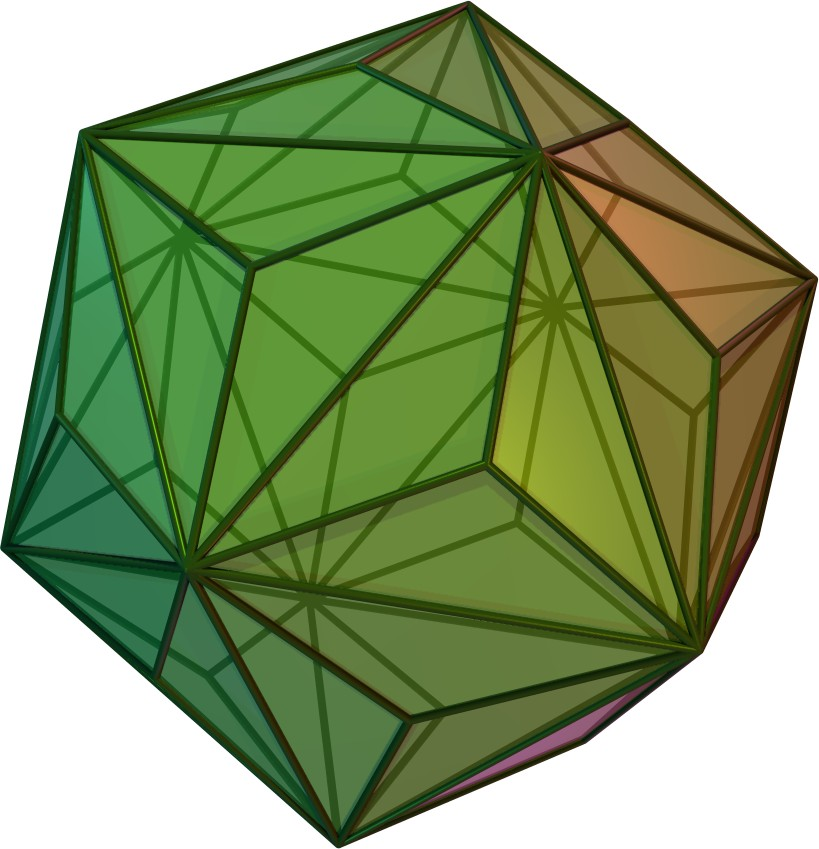
Top left to bottom right: hexagonal pyramid (a prismatoid), truncated tetrahedron (an Archimedean solid), triakis icosahedron (a Catalan solid), and triaugmented triangular prism (a Johnson solid and deltahedron). All of these classes are convex polyhedra.

As mentioned above, the convex polyhedra are well-defined, with several equivalent standard definitions. They are often defined as bounded intersections of finitely many half-spaces, or as the convex hull of finitely many points, restricted in either case to intersections or hulls that have nonzero volume.

The classes of convex polyhedra include the following:

- the family of prismatoid, polyhedra whose vertices lie on two parallel planes and whose faces are likely to be trapezoids and triangles. Examples of prismatoids are pyramids, wedges, parallelipipeds, prisms, antiprisms, cupolas, and frustums.
- Platonic solids are the five ancient polyhedra—tetrahedron, octahedron, icosahedron, cube, and dodecahedron—described by Plato in the Timaeus. Archimedean solids are the class of thirteen polyhedra whose faces are all regular polygons and whose vertices are symmetric to each other; (Note: The Archimedean solids once had fourteenth solid known as the pseudorhombicuboctahedron, a mistaken construction of the rhombicuboctahedron. However, it was debarred for not having the vertex-transitive property, leading it to be instead classified as a Johnson solid.) their dual polyhedra are the Catalan solids.
- Johnson solids are a class of 92 convex polyhedra whose faces are all regular polygons, excluding the uniform polyhedra, namely the Platonic and Archimedean solids, as well as the infinite families of prisms and antiprisms. These include the deltahedra, whose faces are all equilateral triangles.
- Symmetrohedron is the family of infinitely many highly symmetric convex polyhedra, coined by Craig S. Kaplan and George W. Hart, containing regular polygonal faces on symmetry axes with gaps on the convex hull filled by irregular polygons. This involves three-dimensional symmetric groups of tetrahedral, octahedral, and icosahedral symmetry.
- Near-miss Johnson solid is a convex polyhedron whose faces are close to being regular polygons, but some or all of which are not precisely regular. Thus, it fails to meet the definition of a Johnson solid, a polyhedron whose faces are all regular, though it "can often be physically constructed without noticing the discrepancy" between its regular and irregular faces.
- A Goldberg polyhedron is a convex polyhedron with hexagonal and pentagonal faces. Described by Goldberg (1937), they can be obtained from the regular octahedron, regular tetrahedron, and regular icosahedron.

Convex polyhedra can be categorized into elementary polyhedra or composite polyhedra. Elementary polyhedra are convex, regular-faced polyhedra that cannot be produced into two or more polyhedra by slicing them with a plane. Quite opposite to composite polyhedra, they can be alternatively defined as polyhedra constructed by attaching more elementary polyhedra. For example, triaugmented triangular prism is composite since it can be constructed by attaching three equilateral square pyramids onto the square faces of a triangular prism; the square pyramids and the triangular prism are elementaries.

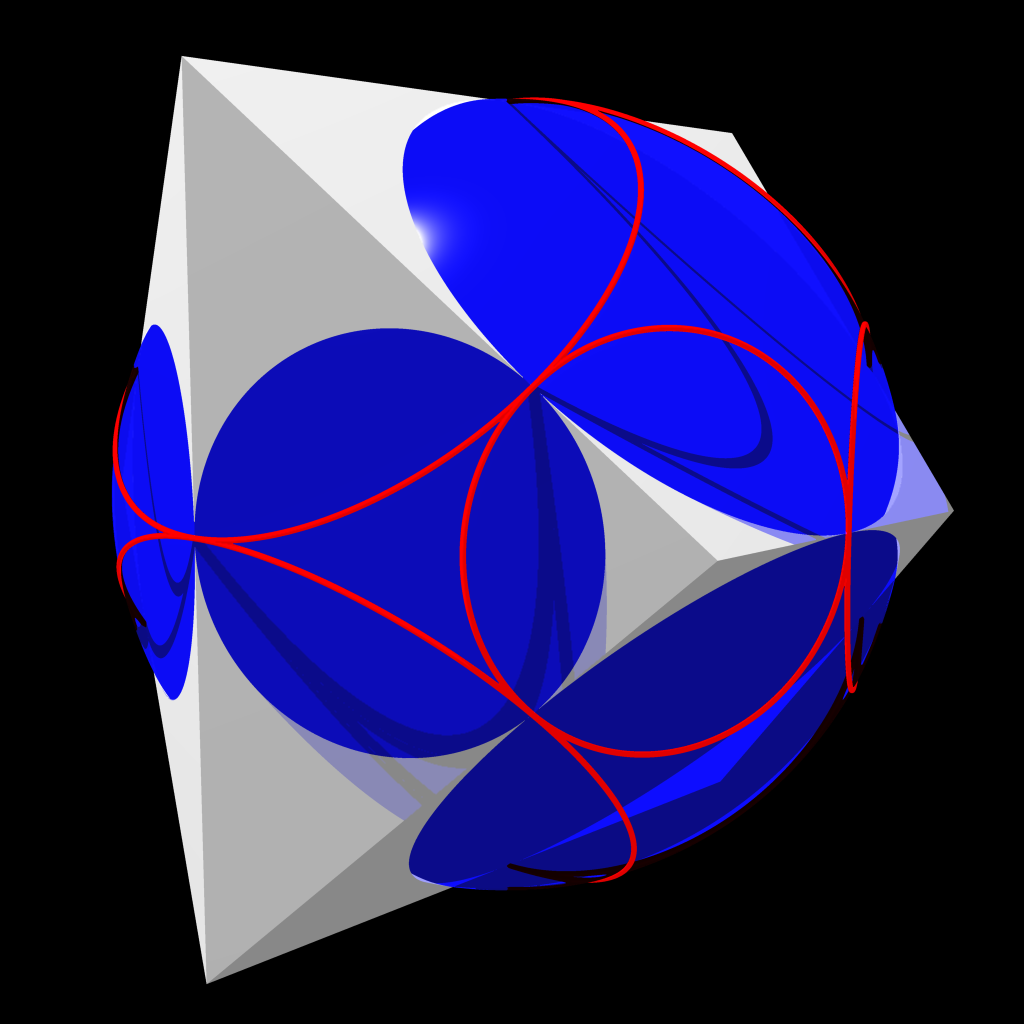
A midsphere

Some convex polyhedra possess a midsphere, a sphere tangent to each of their edges, which is intermediate in radius between the insphere and circumsphere for polyhedra in which all these spheres are present. Every convex polyhedron is combinatorially equivalent to a canonical polyhedron, a polyhedron that has a midsphere whose center coincides with the centroid of its tangent points with edges. The shape of the canonical polyhedron (but not its scale or position) is uniquely determined by the combinatorial structure of the given polyhedron.

Herschel graph is planar and three-connected, satisfying Steinitz's theorem. This results in a convex enneahedron with nine quadrilateral faces.

By forgetting the face structure, any polyhedron gives rise to a graph, called the skeleton of the polyhedron, with corresponding vertices and edges. Such figures have a long history: Leonardo da Vinci devised frame models of the regular solids, which he drew for Pacioli's book Divina Proportione, and similar wire-frame polyhedra appear in M.C. Escher's print Stars. One highlight of this approach is Steinitz's theorem, which gives a purely graph-theoretic characterization of the skeletons of convex polyhedra: it states that the skeleton of every convex polyhedron is a planar graph with three-connected, and every such graph is the skeleton of some convex polyhedron. In other words, these are the connected graphs that can be drawn in the plane without any edges crossing, and that stay connected after removing any two of its vertices.

Prominent non-convex polyhedra include the star polyhedra. The regular star polyhedra, also known as the Kepler–Poinsot polyhedra, are constructible via stellation or faceting of regular convex polyhedra. Stellation is the process of extending the faces (within their planes) so that they meet. Faceting is the process of removing parts of a polyhedron to create new faces (or facets) without creating any new vertices. A facet of a polyhedron is any polygon whose corners are vertices of the polyhedron, and is not a face; for example, a polygon involving diagonals (face diagonals or space diagonals). The stellation and faceting are inverse or reciprocal processes: the dual of some stellation is a faceting of the dual to the original polyhedron. Other examples are the Chazelle polyhedron and toroidal polyhedra.

== Other families of polyhedra ==
=== Space-filling polyhedra ===
Paralellohedra, one of special kinds of space-filling polyhedra

A space-filling polyhedron is one that can be packed together with copies of itself to completely fill space. Such a close-packing or space-filling is often called a tessellation of space or a honeycomb. These include the parallelohedra (or Federov polyhedra), each of which forms a tessellation using copies of itself translated without rotation; the plesiohedra, defined as the Voronoi cells of symmetric Delone sets; and the Hill tetrahedra, a family of space-filling tetrahedra. Parallelohedra and plesiohedra are examples of stereohedra, which tile space isohedrally. Every space-filling polyhedron must have its Dehn invariant equal to zero.

Some honeycombs involve more than one kind of polyhedron, such as a tiling of octahedra and tetrahedra and octahedra and cuboctahedra.

=== Flexible polyhedra ===
Steffen's polyhedron and one of the Bricard polyhedra's type

Some polyhedra can change their overall shape, while keeping the shapes of their faces the same, by varying the angles of their edges. A polyhedron that can do this is called a flexible polyhedron. By Cauchy's rigidity theorem, flexible polyhedra must be non-convex. The volume of a flexible polyhedron must remain constant as it flexes; this result is known as the bellows theorem. Three examples are Steffen's polyhedron, Bricard octahedron, and Kokotsakis polyhedron.

=== Ideal polyhedron ===
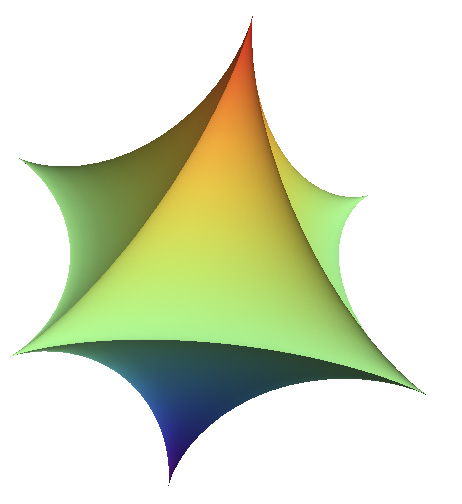
An ideal regular octahedron in the Poincaré ball model of hyperbolic space (sphere at infinity not shown). All dihedral angles of this shape are right angles.

Convex polyhedra can be defined in three-dimensional hyperbolic space in the same way as in Euclidean space, as the convex hulls of finite sets of points. However, in hyperbolic space, it is also possible to consider ideal points and the points within the space. An ideal polyhedron is the convex hull of a finite set of ideal points. Its faces are ideal polygons, but its edges are defined by entire hyperbolic lines rather than line segments, and its vertices (the ideal points of which it is the convex hull) do not lie within the hyperbolic space.

=== Lattice polyhedron ===
Reeve tetrahedra for different choices of the parameter

Convex polyhedra in which all vertices have integer coordinates are called lattice polyhedra or integral polyhedra. The Ehrhart polynomial of lattice a polyhedron counts how many points with integer coordinates lie within a scaled copy of the polyhedron, as a function of the scale factor. The study of these polynomials lies at the intersection of combinatorics and commutative algebra. An example is Reeve tetrahedron.

There is a far-reaching equivalence between lattice polyhedra and certain algebraic varieties called toric varieties. This was used by Stanley to prove the Dehn–Sommerville equations for simplicial polytopes.

=== Polyhedral compound ===
The compound of two tetrahedra or the stellated octahedron is made from a red and a green tetrahedron crossing each other

A polyhedral compound is made of two or more polyhedra sharing a common centre. Symmetrical compounds often share the same vertices as other well-known polyhedra and may often also be formed by stellation. For instance, the compound of two tetrahedra is made from two regular tetrahedra crossing each other, or alternatively by extending the underlying faces of a regular octahedron, thus it is also called the "stellated octahedron"; the resulting polyhedron forms additional triangular faces.

=== Zonohedron ===
A zonohedron is a convex polyhedron in which every face is a polygon that is symmetric under rotations through 180°. Zonohedra can also be characterized as the Minkowski sums of line segments, and include several important space-filling polyhedra.

=== Orthogonal polyhedron ===
Some orthogonal polyhedra made of Soma cube pieces, themselves polycubes

Polyhedra are said to be orthogonal because all of their edges are parallel to the axes of a Cartesian coordinate system. This implies that all faces meet at right angles, but this condition is weaker: Jessen's icosahedron has faces meeting at right angles, but does not have axis-parallel edges. Aside from the rectangular cuboids, orthogonal polyhedra are nonconvex. They are the three-dimensional analogs of two-dimensional orthogonal polygons, also known as rectilinear polygons. Orthogonal polyhedra are used in computational geometry, where their constrained structure has enabled advances in problems unsolved for arbitrary polyhedra, for example, unfolding the surface of a polyhedron to a polygonal net. Polycubes are a special case of orthogonal polyhedra that can be decomposed into identical cubes, and are three-dimensional analogues of planar polyominoes.

== Generalisations ==
The name 'polyhedron' has come to be used for a variety of objects having similar structural properties to traditional polyhedra.

=== Apeirohedra ===
A classical polyhedral surface has a finite number of faces, joined in pairs along edges. The apeirohedra form a related class of objects with infinitely many faces. Examples of apeirohedra include tilings or tessellations of the plane, and sponge-like structures called infinite skew polyhedra.

Three regular skew apeirohedra by Petrie and Coxeter: mucube, muoctahedron, and mutetrahedron

The skew polyhedra are the polyhedra with non-planar faces. The regular skew apeirohedra originated from the extension of regular skew polygons. These polygons are known for non-planar vertices. John Flinders Petrie, who generalized such a concept into a three-dimensional case in 1926, invented the first two such apeirohedra. These are the mucube and mucotahedron, which constructed of cubes and truncated octahedra by removing the shared square faces of adjacent polyhedra to form a tunnels. The third regular skew polyhedron, mutetrahedron, was later discovered by Harold Scott MacDonald Coxeter by the construction of multiple truncated tetrahedra under Petrie's procedure.

=== Complex polyhedra ===
There are objects called complex polyhedra, for which the underlying space is a complex Hilbert space rather than real Euclidean space. Precise definitions exist only for the regular complex polyhedra, whose symmetry groups are complex reflection groups. The complex polyhedra are mathematically more closely related to configurations than to real polyhedra.

=== Curved polyhedra ===
Some fields of study allow polyhedra to have curved faces and edges. Curved faces can allow digonal faces to exist with a positive area.

- When the surface of a sphere is divided by finitely many great arcs (equivalently, by planes passing through the center of the sphere), the result is called a spherical polyhedron. Many convex polytopes having some degree of symmetry (for example, all the Platonic solids) can be projected onto the surface of a concentric sphere to produce a spherical polyhedron. However, the reverse process is not always possible; some spherical polyhedra (such as the hosohedra) have no flat-faced analogue.
- If faces are allowed to be concave as well as convex, adjacent faces may be made to meet together with no gap. Some of these curved polyhedra can pack together to fill space. Two important types are bubbles in froths and foams such as Weaire-Phelan bubbles, and forms used in architecture.

== Higher-dimensional polyhedra ==
From the latter half of the twentieth century, various mathematical constructs have been found to have properties also present in traditional polyhedra. Rather than confining the term "polyhedron" to describe a three-dimensional polytope, it has been adopted to describe various related but distinct kinds of structure.

A polyhedron has been defined as a set of points in real affine (or Euclidean) space of any dimension n that has flat sides. It may alternatively be defined as the intersection of finitely many half-spaces. Unlike a conventional polyhedron, it may be bounded or unbounded. In this meaning, a polytope is a bounded polyhedron.

Analytically, such a convex polyhedron is expressed as the solution set for a system of linear inequalities. Defining polyhedra in this way provides a geometric perspective for problems in linear programming.

== History ==
=== Before the Greeks ===
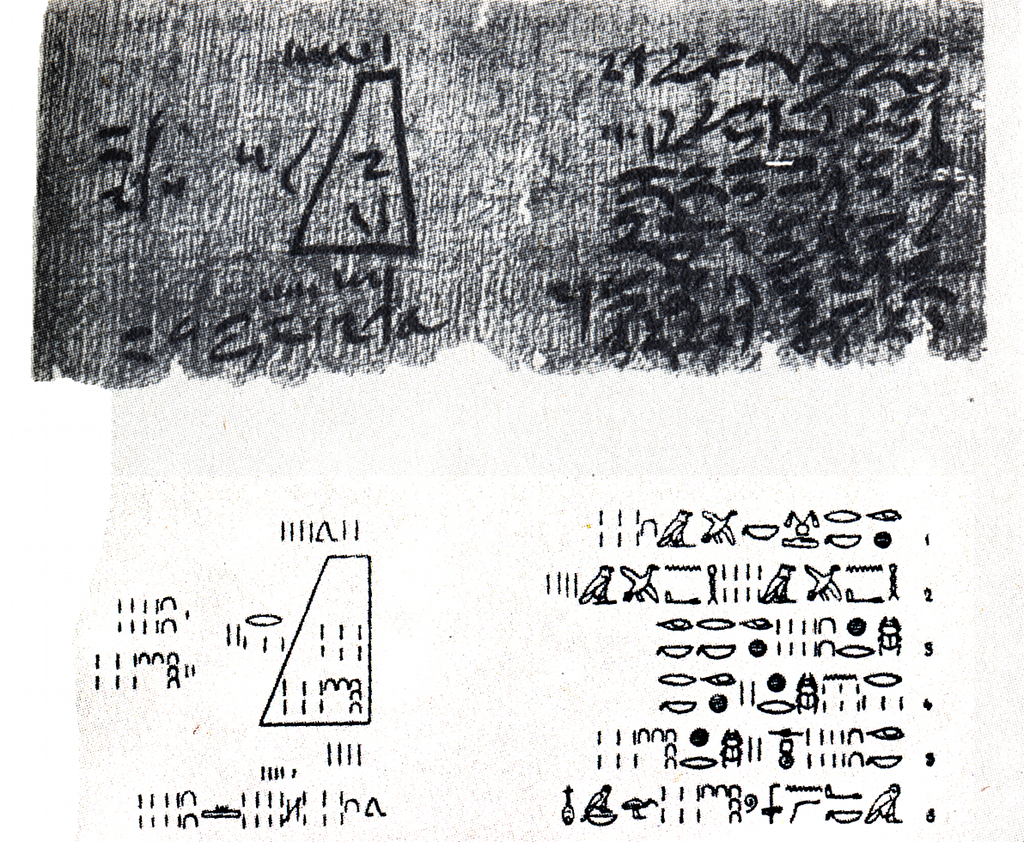
Problem 14 of the Moscow Mathematical Papyrus, on calculating the volume of a frustum

Polyhedra appeared in early architectural forms such as cubes and cuboids, with the earliest four-sided Egyptian pyramids dating from the 27th century BC. The Moscow Mathematical Papyrus from approximately 1800–1650 BC includes an early written study of polyhedra and their volumes (specifically, the volume of a frustum). The mathematics of the Old Babylonian Empire, from roughly the same time period as the Moscow Papyrus, also included calculations of the volumes of cuboids (and of non-polyhedral cylinders), and calculations of the height of such a shape needed to attain a given volume.

The Etruscans preceded the Greeks in their awareness of at least some of the regular polyhedra, as evidenced by the discovery of an Etruscan dodecahedron made of soapstone on Monte Loffa. Its faces were marked with different designs, suggesting to some scholars that it may have been used as a gaming die.

=== Ancient Greece ===
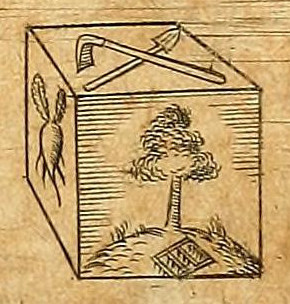
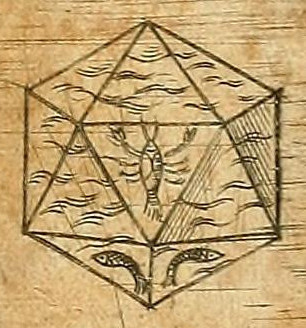
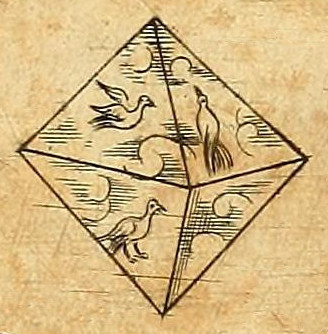
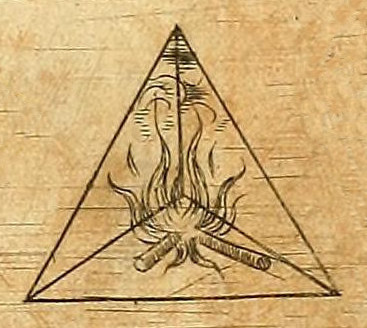
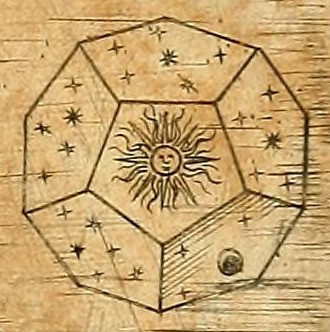
Platonic solids assigned to the elements (drawings from Kepler's Harmonices Mundi)

Ancient Greek mathematicians discovered and studied the convex regular polyhedra, which came to be known as the Platonic solids. Their first written description is in the Timaeus of Plato (circa 360 BC), which associates four of them with the four elements and the fifth to the overall shape of the universe. A more mathematical treatment of these five polyhedra was written soon after in the Elements of Euclid. An early commentator on Euclid (possibly Geminus) writes that the attribution of these shapes to Plato is incorrect: Pythagoras knew the tetrahedron, cube, and dodecahedron, and Theaetetus (circa 417 BC) discovered the other two, the octahedron and icosahedron. Later, Archimedes expanded his study to the convex uniform polyhedra which now bear his name. His original work is lost and his solids come down to us through Pappus.

=== Ancient China ===
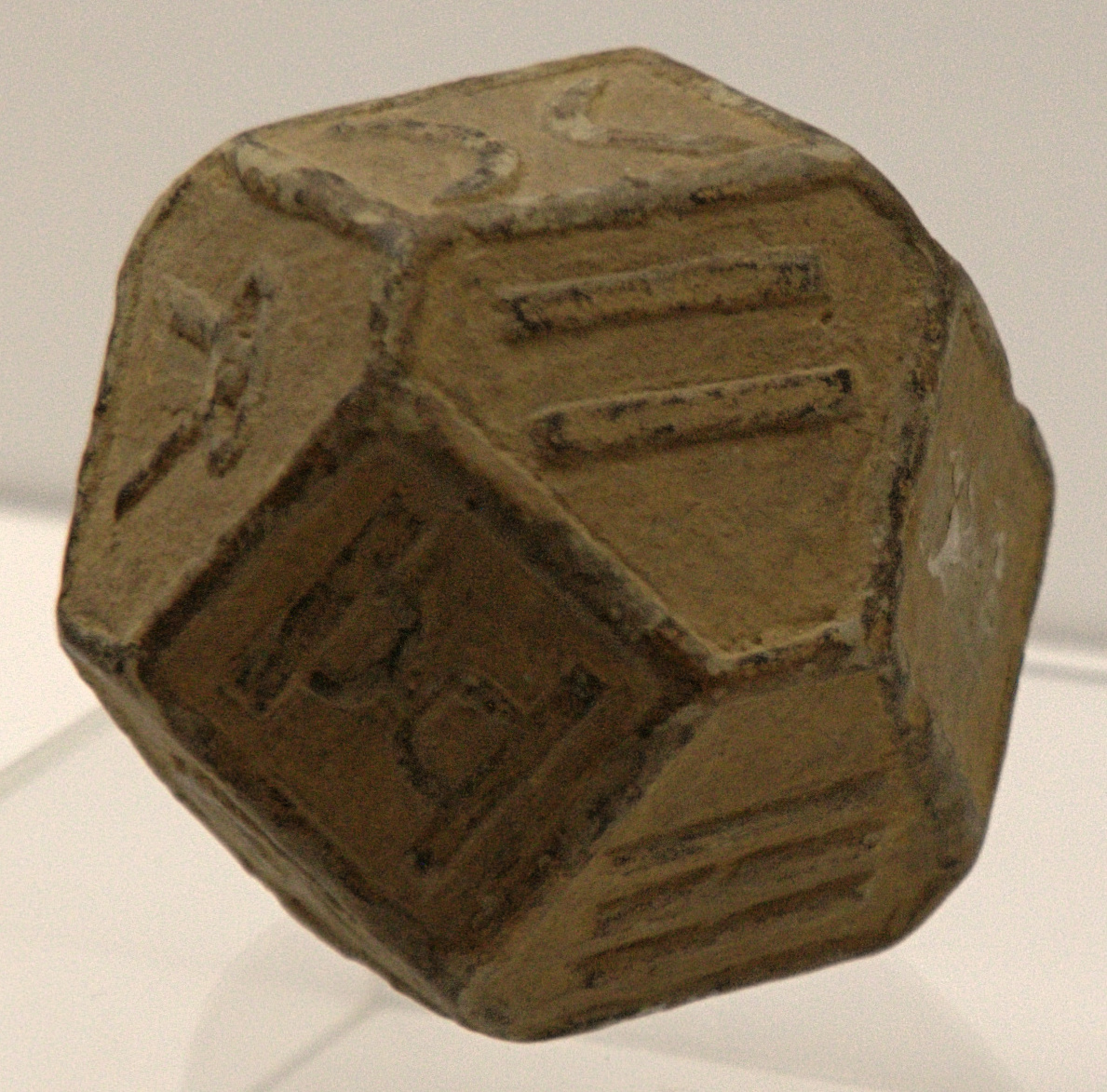
Fourteen sided die from the Warring States period

Both cubical dice and 14-sided dice in the shape of a truncated octahedron in China have been dated back as early as the Warring States period.

By 236 AD, Liu Hui was describing the dissection of the cube into its characteristic tetrahedron (orthoscheme) and related solids, using assemblages of these solids as the basis for calculating volumes of earth to be moved during engineering excavations.

=== Medieval Islam ===
After the end of the Classical era, scholars in the Islamic civilisation continued to take the Greek knowledge forward (see Mathematics in medieval Islam). The 9th century scholar Thabit ibn Qurra included the calculation of volumes in his studies, and wrote a work on the cuboctahedron. Then in the 10th century Abu'l Wafa described the convex regular and quasiregular spherical polyhedra.

=== Renaissance ===
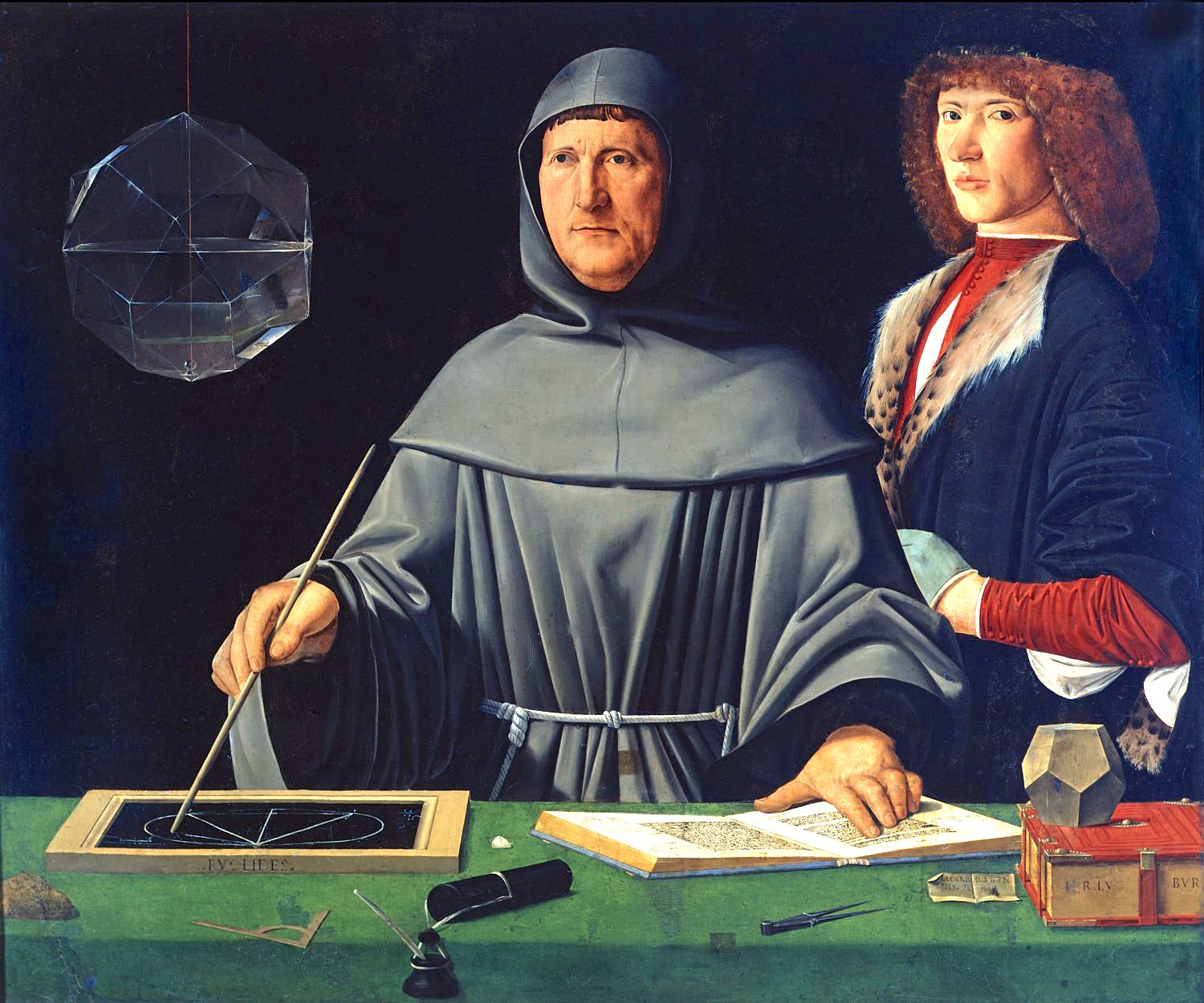
Doppio ritratto, attributed to Jacopo de' Barbari, depicting Luca Pacioli and a student studying a glass rhombicuboctahedron half-filled with water.

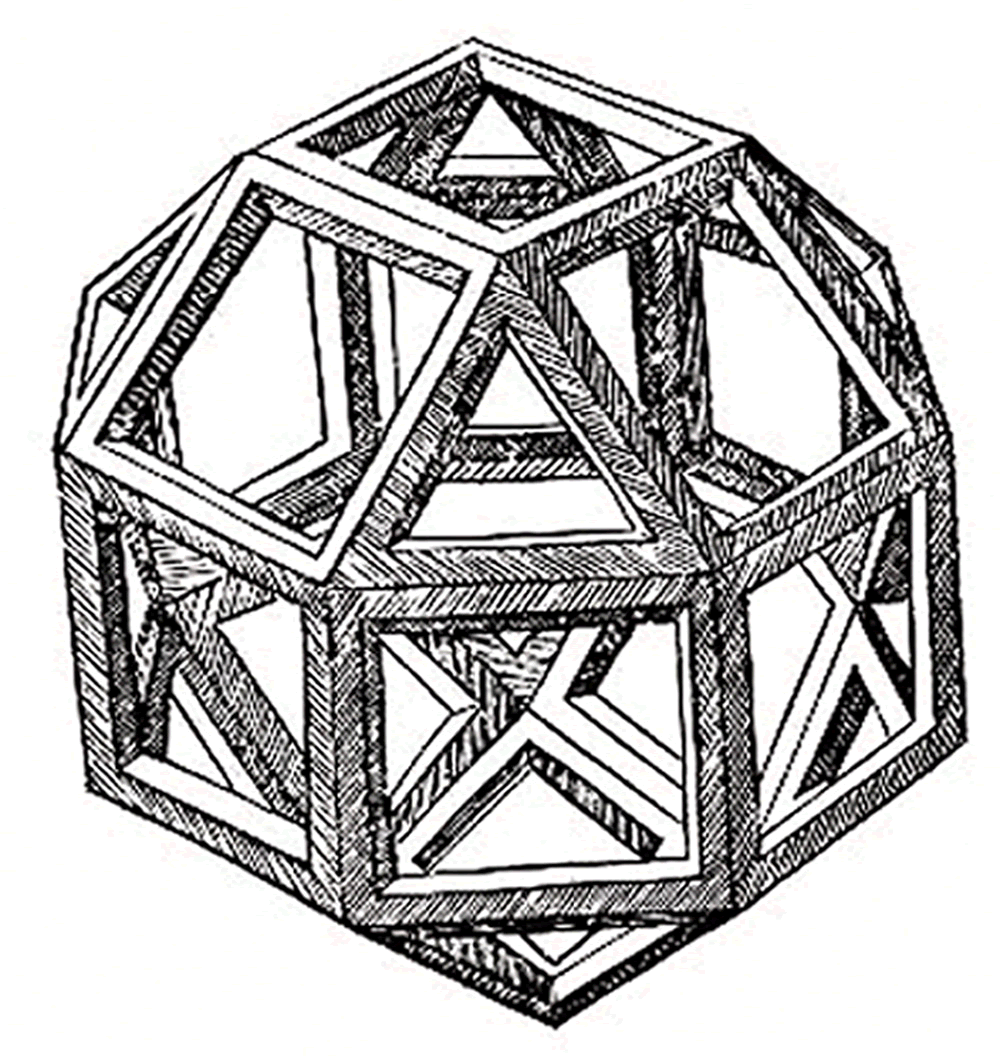
A skeletal polyhedron (specifically, a rhombicuboctahedron) drawn by Leonardo da Vinci to illustrate a book by Luca Pacioli

As with other areas of Greek thought maintained and enhanced by Islamic scholars, Western interest in polyhedra revived during the Italian Renaissance. Artists constructed skeletal polyhedra, depicting them from life as a part of their investigations into perspective. Toroidal polyhedra, made of wood and used to support headgear, became a common exercise in perspective drawing, and were depicted in marquetry panels of the period as a symbol of geometry. Piero della Francesca wrote about constructing perspective views of polyhedra, and rediscovered many of the Archimedean solids. Leonardo da Vinci illustrated skeletal models of several polyhedra for a book by Luca Pacioli, with text largely plagiarized from della Francesca. Polyhedral nets make an appearance in the work of Albrecht Dürer.

Several works from this time investigate star polyhedra and other elaborations of the basic Platonic forms. A marble tarsia in the floor of St. Mark's Basilica, Venice, designed by Paolo Uccello, depicts a stellated dodecahedron. As the Renaissance spread beyond Italy, later artists such as Wenzel Jamnitzer, Dürer and others also depicted polyhedra of increasing complexity, many of them novel, in imaginative etchings. Johannes Kepler (1571–1630) used star polygons, typically pentagrams, to build star polyhedra. Some of these figures may have been discovered before Kepler's time, but he was the first to recognize that they could be considered "regular" if one removed the restriction that regular polyhedra must be convex.

In the same period, Euler's polyhedral formula, a linear equation relating the numbers of vertices, edges, and faces of a polyhedron, was stated for the Platonic solids in 1537 in an unpublished manuscript by Francesco Maurolico.

=== 17th–19th centuries ===
René Descartes, in around 1630, wrote his book De solidorum elementis studying convex polyhedra as a general concept, not limited to the Platonic solids and their elaborations. The work was lost, and not rediscovered until the 19th century. One of its contributions was Descartes' theorem on total angular defect, which is closely related to Euler's polyhedral formula. Leonhard Euler, for whom the formula is named, introduced it in 1758 for convex polyhedra more generally, albeit with an incorrect proof. Euler's work (together with his earlier solution to the puzzle of the Seven Bridges of Königsberg) became the foundation of the new field of topology. The core concepts of this field, including generalizations of the polyhedral formula, were developed in the late nineteenth century by Henri Poincaré, Enrico Betti, Bernhard Riemann, and others.

In the early 19th century, Louis Poinsot extended Kepler's work, and discovered the remaining two regular star polyhedra. Soon after, Augustin-Louis Cauchy proved Poinsot's list complete, subject to an unstated assumption that the sequence of vertices and edges of each polygonal side cannot admit repetitions (an assumption that had been considered but rejected in the earlier work of A. F. L. Meister). They became known as the Kepler–Poinsot polyhedra, and their usual names were given by Arthur Cayley. Meanwhile, the discovery of higher dimensions in the early 19th century led Ludwig Schläfli by 1853 to the idea of higher-dimensional polytopes. Additionally, in the late 19th century, Russian crystallographer Evgraf Fedorov completed the classification of parallelohedra, convex polyhedra that tile space by translations.

=== 20th–21st centuries ===
Mathematics in the 20th century dawned with Hilbert's problems, one of which, Hilbert's third problem, concerned polyhedra and their dissections. It was quickly solved by Hilbert's student Max Dehn, introducing the Dehn invariant of polyhedra. Steinitz's theorem, published by Ernst Steinitz in 1992, characterized the graphs of convex polyhedra, bringing modern ideas from graph theory and combinatorics into the study of polyhedra.

The Kepler–Poinsot polyhedra may be constructed from the Platonic solids by a process called stellation. Most stellations are not regular. The study of stellations of the Platonic solids was given a big push by H.S.M. Coxeter and others in 1938, with the now famous paper The Fifty-Nine Icosahedra. Coxeter's analysis signaled a rebirth of interest in geometry. Coxeter himself went on to enumerate the star uniform polyhedra for the first time, to treat tilings of the plane as polyhedra, to discover the regular skew polyhedra and to develop the theory of complex polyhedra first discovered by Shephard in 1952, as well as making fundamental contributions to many other areas of geometry.

In the second part of the twentieth century, both Branko Grünbaum and Imre Lakatos pointed out the tendency among mathematicians to define a "polyhedron" in different and sometimes incompatible ways to suit the needs of the moment. In a series of papers, Grünbaum broadened the accepted definition of a polyhedron, discovering many new regular polyhedra. At the close of the twentieth century, these latter ideas merged with other work on incidence complexes to create the modern idea of an abstract polyhedron (as an abstract 3-polytope), notably presented by McMullen and Schulte.

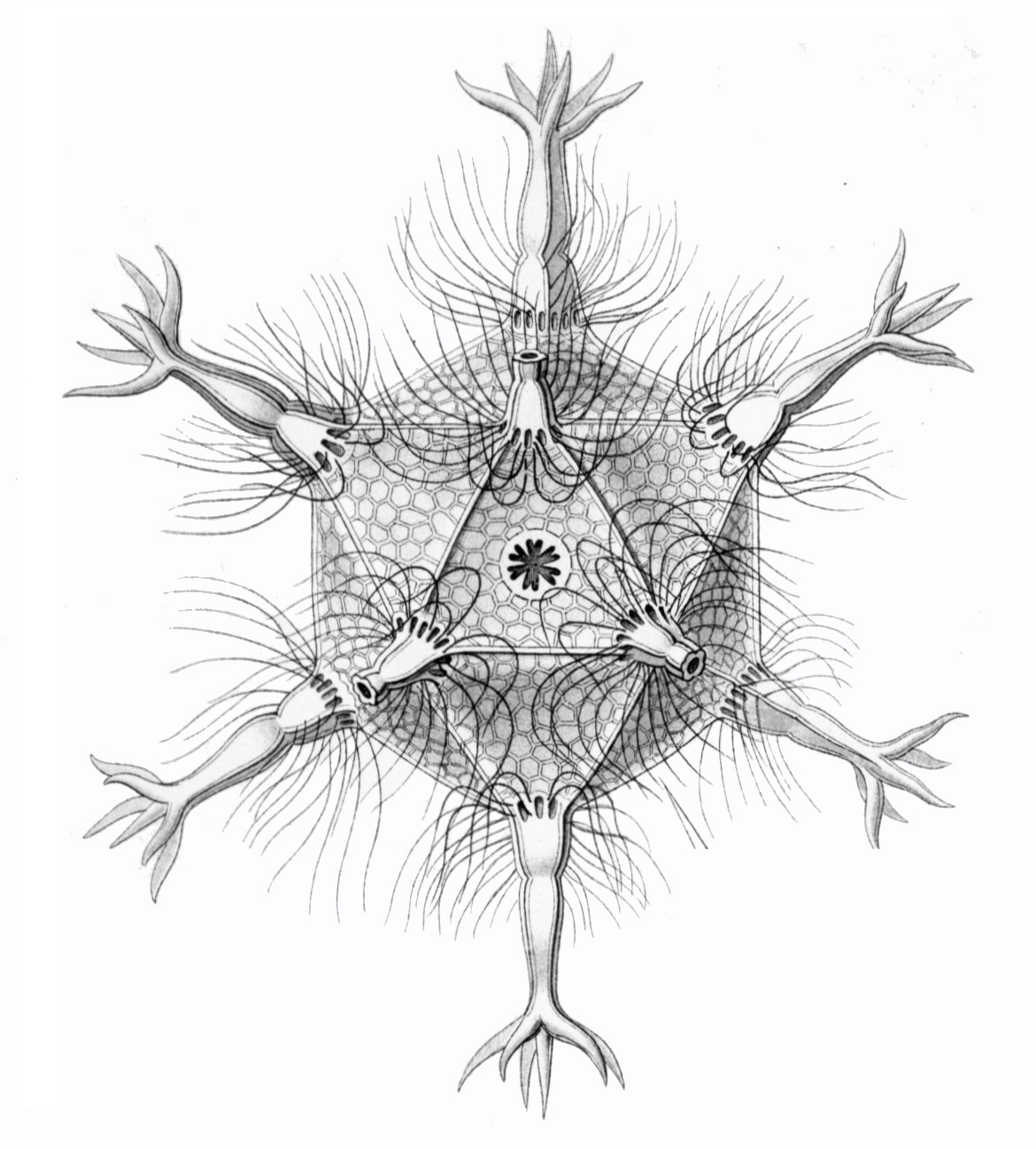
The radiolarian Circogonia icosahedra

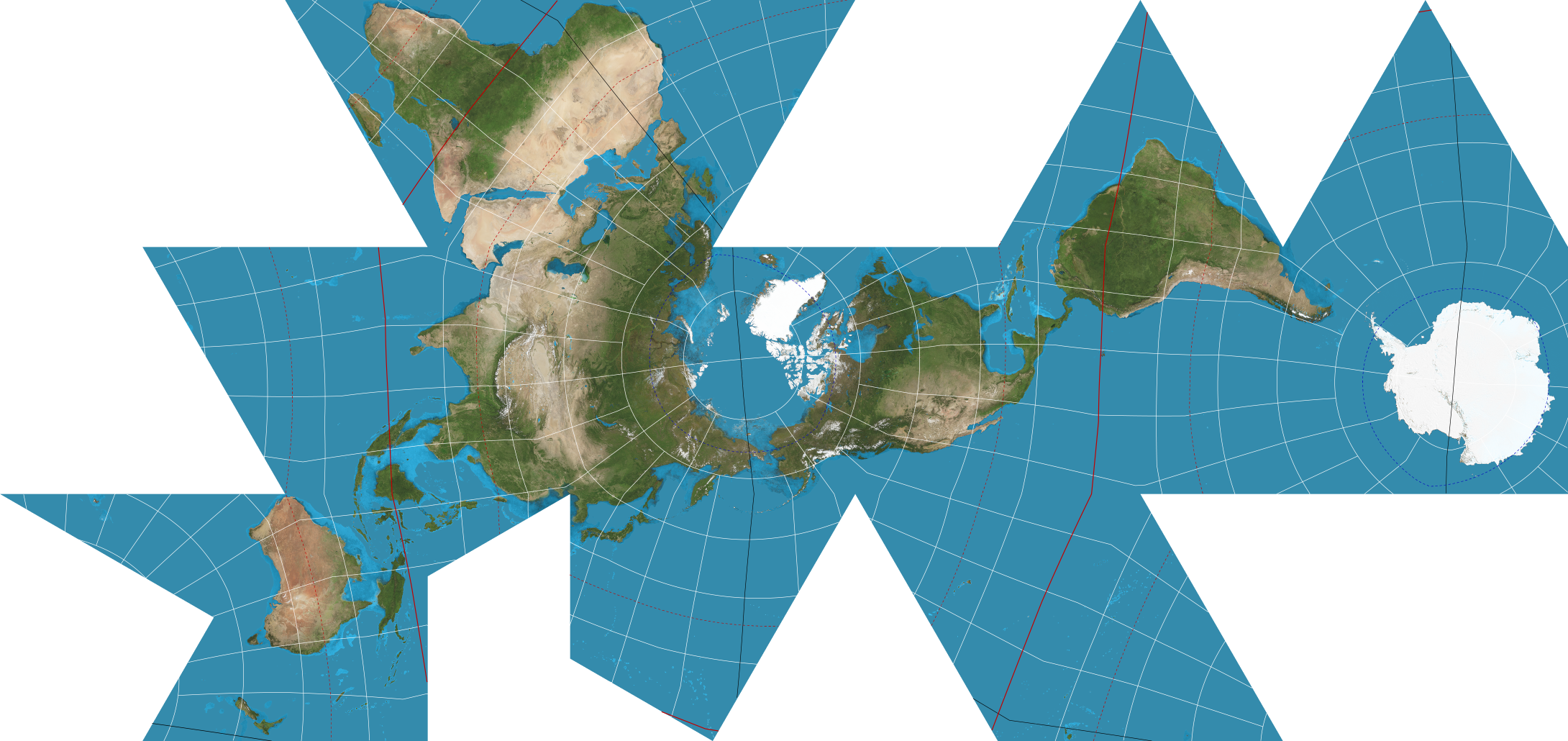
Dymaxion map, created by the net of a regular icosahedron

Polyhedra have been discovered in many fields of science. The Platonic solids appeared in biological creatures, as in The Braarudosphaera bigelowii has a regular dodecahedral structure. Ernst Haeckel described a number of species of radiolarians, some of whose shells are shaped like various regular polyhedra. The outer protein shells of many viruses form regular polyhedra. For example, HIV is enclosed in a regular icosahedron, as is the head of a typical myovirus. The regular icosahedron may also appeared in the applications of cartography when R. Buckminster Fuller used its net to his project known as Dymaxion map, frustatedly realized that the Greenland size is smaller than the South America.

Polyhedra make a frequent appearance in modern computational geometry, computer graphics, and geometric design with topics including the reconstruction of polyhedral surfaces or surface meshes from scattered data points, geodesics on polyhedral surfaces, visibility and illumination in polyhedral scenes, polycubes and other non-convex polyhedra with axis-parallel sides, algorithmic forms of Steinitz's theorem, and the still-unsolved problem of the existence of polyhedral nets for convex polyhedra.

== See also ==
- Associahedron, a convex polytope in which each vertex corresponds to a way of correctly inserting opening and closing parentheses
- Dihedron, a polyhedron with two faces
- Equiprojective polyhedra, orthogonal projection of the polygon onto a plane in a direction not parallel to a face of the polyhedron forms a polygon
- Extension complexity, the smallest number of facets among convex polytopes that has another one as a projection
- Holyhedron, each of the polyhedron's faces contains at least one polygon-shaped hole, and the boundaries share no point on the face's boundary
- List of books about polyhedra, listing polyhedral books regarding the modeling, studies, and history of polyhedra
- Monostatic polytope, a polytope standing on one face only
- Gauss–Bonnet theorem, a formula that links the curvature of a surface to its underlying topology
- Polyhedral number, a term for figurate numbers in different dimensions
- Polyhedral skeletal electron pair theory
- Polyhedral space, a certain metric space
- Polyhedral symbol, indicating the approximate geometry of the coordinating atoms around the central atom in coordination chemistry
- Polyhedral terrain, a polyhedral surface intersecting every line parallel to some particular line in a connected set or the empty set
- Polytope model, a mathematical framework for programs that perform large numbers of operations
- Rupert property, a property where a polyhedron of the same or larger size and the same size can pass through a hole
- Schwarz lantern, a polyhedral approximation to a cylinder
- Stella (software), a computer graphics software creating a polyhedral model
