= Polyhedron model =

Physical manifestation of a geometric shape

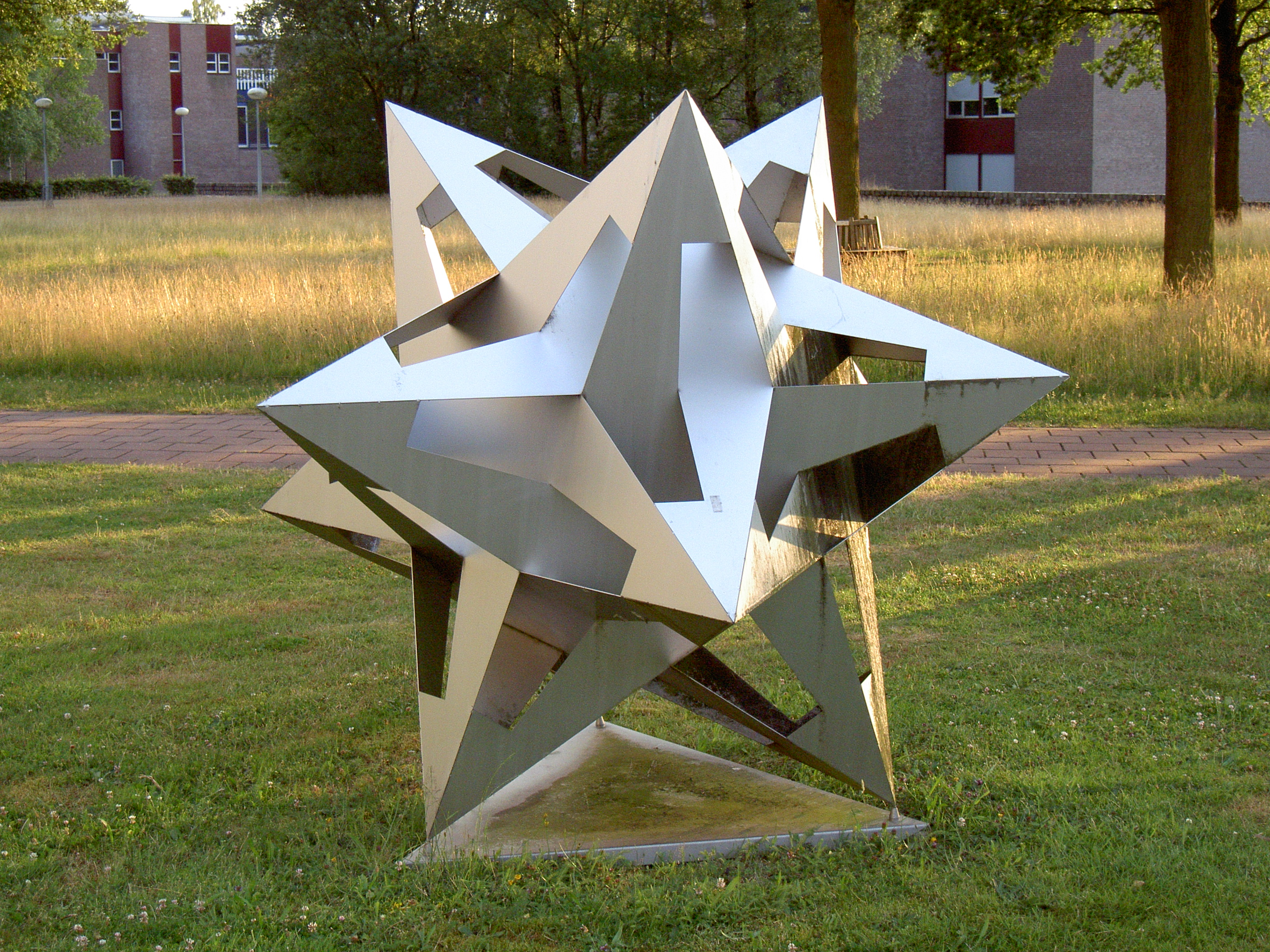
A sculpture of the small stellated dodecahedron in M. C. Escher's Gravitation, near the Mesa+ Institute of Universiteit Twente

A polyhedron model is a physical construction of a polyhedron, constructed from cardboard, plastic board, wood board or other panel material, or, less commonly, solid material.

Since there are 75 uniform polyhedra, including the five regular convex polyhedra, five polyhedral compounds, four Kepler-Poinsot polyhedra, and thirteen Archimedean solids, constructing or collecting polyhedron models has become a common mathematical recreation. Polyhedron models are found in mathematics classrooms much as globes in geography classrooms.

Polyhedron models are notable as three-dimensional proof-of-concepts of geometric theories. Some polyhedra also make great centerpieces, tree toppers, Holiday decorations, or symbols. The Merkaba religious symbol, for example, is a stellated octahedron. Constructing large models offer challenges in engineering structural design.

== Construction ==
A net for the regular dodecahedron

Construction begins by choosing a size of the model, either the length of its edges or the height of the model. The size will dictate the material, the adhesive for edges, the construction time and the method of construction.

The second decision involves colours. A single-colour cardboard model is easiest to construct — and some models can be made by folding a pattern, called a net, from a single sheet of cardboard. Choosing colours requires geometric understanding of the polyhedron. One way is to colour each face differently. A second way is to colour all square faces the same, all pentagonal faces the same, and so forth. A third way is to colour opposite faces the same. Many polyhedra are also coloured such that no same-coloured faces touch each other along an edge or at a vertex.

For example, a 20-face icosahedron can use twenty colours, one colour, ten colours, or five colours, respectively.

An alternative way for polyhedral compound models is to use a different colour for each polyhedron component.

Net templates are then made. One way is to copy templates from a polyhedron-making book, such as Magnus Wenninger's Polyhedron Models, 1974 (ISBN 0-521-09859-9). A second way is drawing faces on paper or with computer-aided design software and then drawing on them the polyhedron's edges. The exposed nets of the faces are then traced or printed on template material. A third way is using the software named Stella to print nets.

A model, particularly a large one, may require another polyhedron as its inner structure or as a construction mold. A suitable inner structure prevents the model from collapsing from age or stress.

The net templates are then replicated onto the material, matching carefully the chosen colours. Cardboard nets are usually cut with tabs on each edge, so the next step for cardboard nets is to score each fold with a knife. Panelboard nets, on the other hand, require molds and cement adhesives.

Assembling multi-colour models is easier with a model of a simpler related polyhedron used as a colour guide. Complex models, such as stellations, can have hundreds of polygons in their nets.

== Interactive computer models ==
Recent computer graphics technologies allow people to rotate 3D polyhedron models on a computer video screen in all three dimensions. Recent technologies even provide shadows and textures for a more realistic effect.

== See also ==
- Polyhedron
- List of Wenninger polyhedron models
