= Orthogonal polyhedron =

Polyhedron in which all edges are parallel

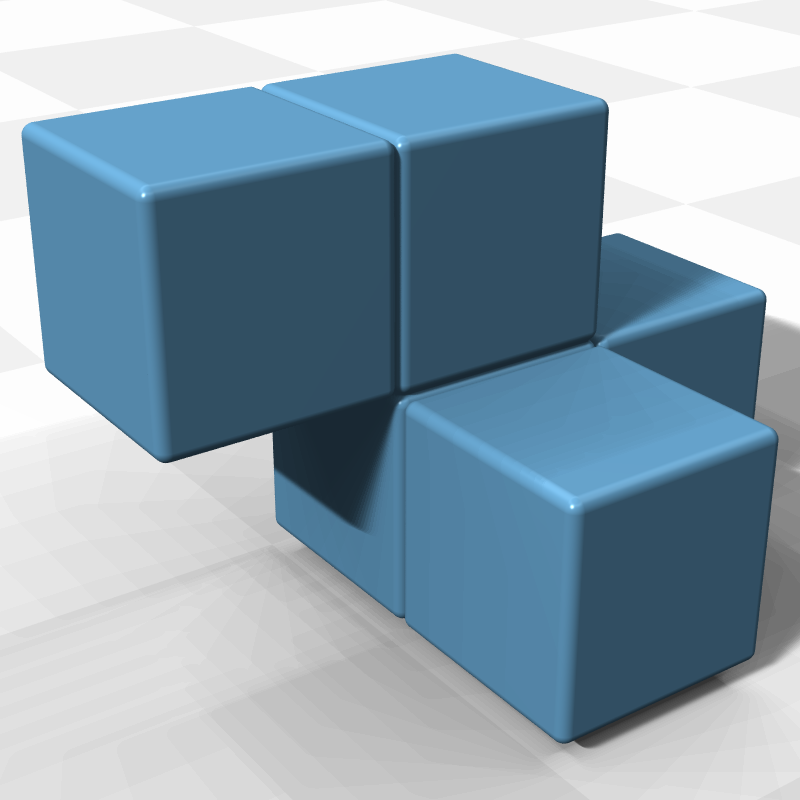
A polycube is an example of the orthogonal polyhedron, whereas Jessen's icosahedron is not

An orthogonal polyhedron is a polyhedron in which all edges are parallel to the axes of a 3D Cartesian coordinate system, resulting in the orthogonal faces and implying the dihedral angle between faces are right angles.

Though the angles between Jessen's icosahedron's faces are right angles, the edges are not axis-parallel, thus Jessen's icosahedron is not an orthogonal polyhedron.

Polycubes are a special case of orthogonal polyhedra that can be decomposed into identical cubes and are three-dimensional analogs of planar polyominoes. Orthogonal polyhedra can be either convex (such as rectangular cuboids) or non-convex.

In computational geometry, the constrained structure of orthogonal polyhedra has enabled advances in problems unsolved for arbitrary polyhedra, for example, unfolding the surface of a polyhedron to a polygonal net.

The simple orthogonal polyhedra, as defined by Eppstein & Mumford (2014), are the three-dimensional polyhedra such that three mutually perpendicular edges meet at each vertex and that have the topology of a sphere. By using Steinitz's theorem, there are three different classes: the arbitrary orthogonal polyhedron, the skeleton of its polyhedron drawn with a hidden vertex by the isometric projection, and the polyhedron wherein each axis-parallel line through a vertex contains other vertices. All of these are polyhedral graphs that are cubic and bipartite.
