= Stella (software) =

3D graphics software

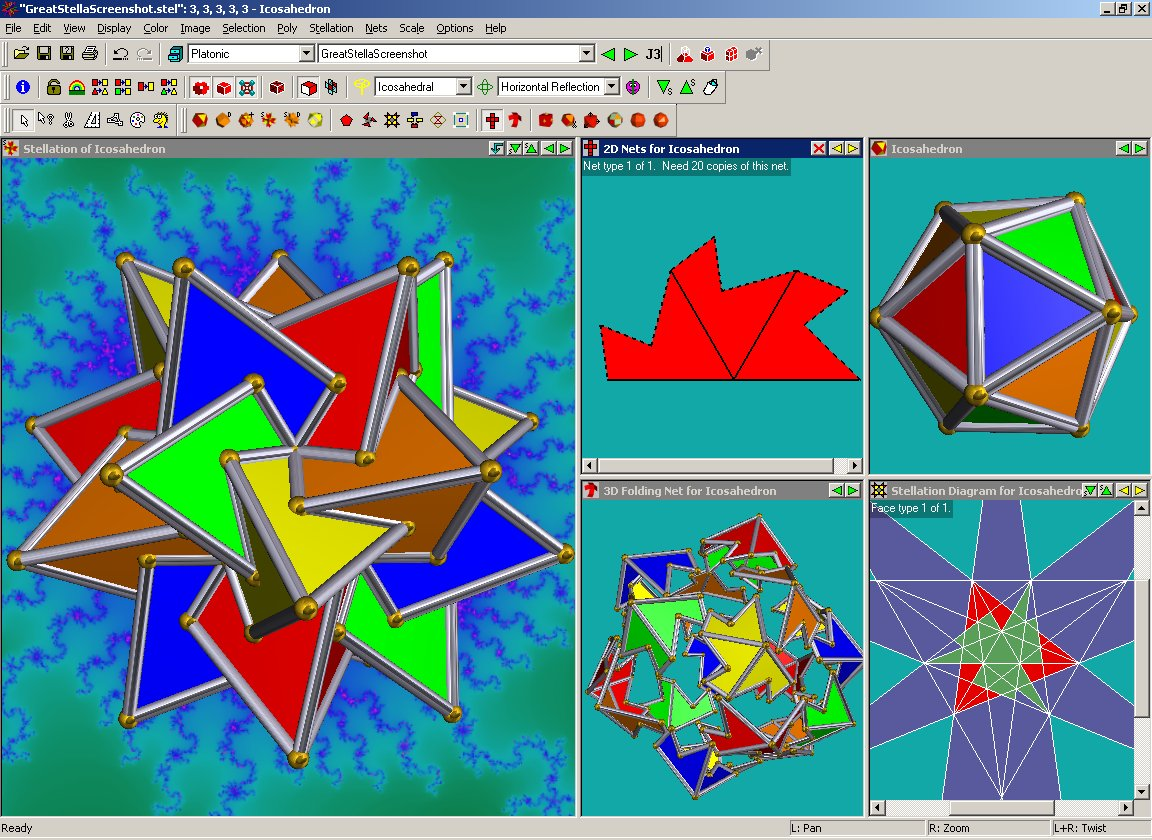
- Great Stella showing the stellation diagram and net for the compound of five tetrahedra
- Developer: Robert Webb
- Stable release: 6.0 /
- Website: www.software3d.com/Stella.php

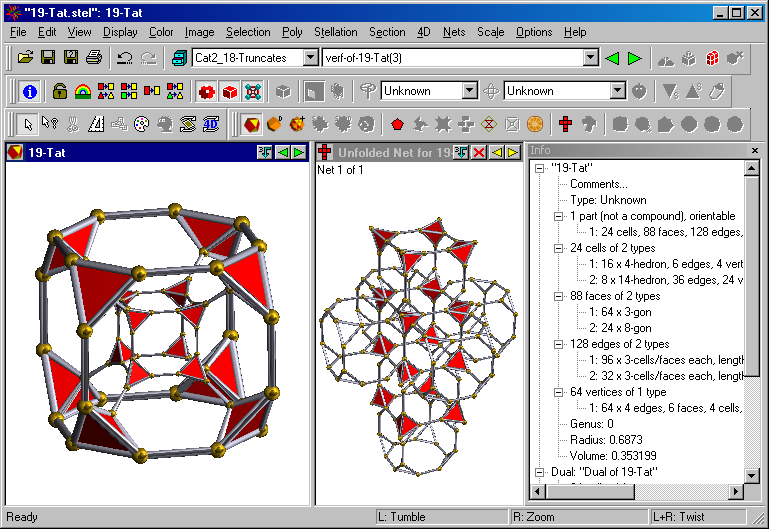
Screenshot from Stella4D, looking at the truncated tesseract in perspective and its net, truncated cube cells hidden

Stella is a computer program available in three versions (Great Stella, Small Stella and Stella4D). It was created by [[Robert Webb]], an Australian programmer and geometry enthusiast. The programs contain a large library of polyhedra which can be manipulated and altered in various ways.

== Polyhedra ==
Polyhedra in Great Stella's library include the Platonic solids, the Archimedean solids, the Kepler-Poinsot solids, the Johnson solids, some Johnson Solid near-misses, numerous compounds including the uniform polyhedra, and other polyhedra. Operations which can be performed on these polyhedra include stellation, faceting, augmentation, dualization (also called "reciprocation"), creating convex hulls, and others.

All versions of the program enable users to print nets for polyhedra. These nets may then be assembled into actual three-dimensional polyhedral models.

== Stella4D ==
In 2007, a Stella4D version was added, allowing the generation and display of four-dimensional polytopes (polychora), including a library of all convex uniform polychora, and all currently known nonconvex star polychora, as well as the uniform duals. They can be selected from a library or generated from user created polyhedral vertex figure files.

== Features ==
Stella provides a configurable workspace comprising several panels. Once a model has been selected from the range available, different views of it may be displayed in each panel. These views can also include measurements, symmetries and unfolded nets.

A variety of operations may be performed on any polyhedron. In 3D these include: stellation, faceting, augmentation, excavation, drilling and dualising.

Other features include spring network relaxation, generation of the convex hull, and generation of cupolaic blends and related figures.

== Release history ==
- v1.0 – 20th August 2001 – First release of Stella
  - v1.1 – 14th January 2002
- v2.0 – 12th September 2002
  - v2.8.7 – 16th November 2004
- v3.0 – 12th June 2005
  - v3.5.1 – 10th May 2006
- v4.0 – 13th March 2007 – (Including new "Stella4D")
  - v4.4 – 11th January 2008
- v5.0 – 30th September 2012
  - v5.4 – 10th May 2014
- v6.0 – 11th August 2026
  - v6.1 – 10th October 2026
    - v6.1.1 - 11th October 2026
