= Monte Loffa =

Mountain in Italy

- Location within Italy

Highest point
- Elevation: 1,200 m (3,900 ft)
- Coordinates: 45°38′11″N 10°56′12″E

Geography
- Location: Veneto, Italy

Monte Loffa is a mountain of the Veneto, Italy. It has an elevation of 1,200 metres (3,937 ft).

Monte Loffa was settled by the Raetic people during the Iron Age (5th to 2nd centuries BCE), who manufactured fabrics, leaving behind inscribed loom weights.
