= Tetrahedral honeycomb =

This may refer to:

- Tetrahedral-octahedral honeycomb - Uniform honeycomb with regular tetrahedral and octahedral cells
- Tetragonal disphenoid honeycomb - Uniform dual honeycomb with tetragonal disphenoid cells
- Phyllic disphenoidal honeycomb - Uniform dual honeycomb with phyllic disphenoid cells
