= Architectonic and catoptric tessellation =

Uniform Euclidean 3D tessellations and their duals

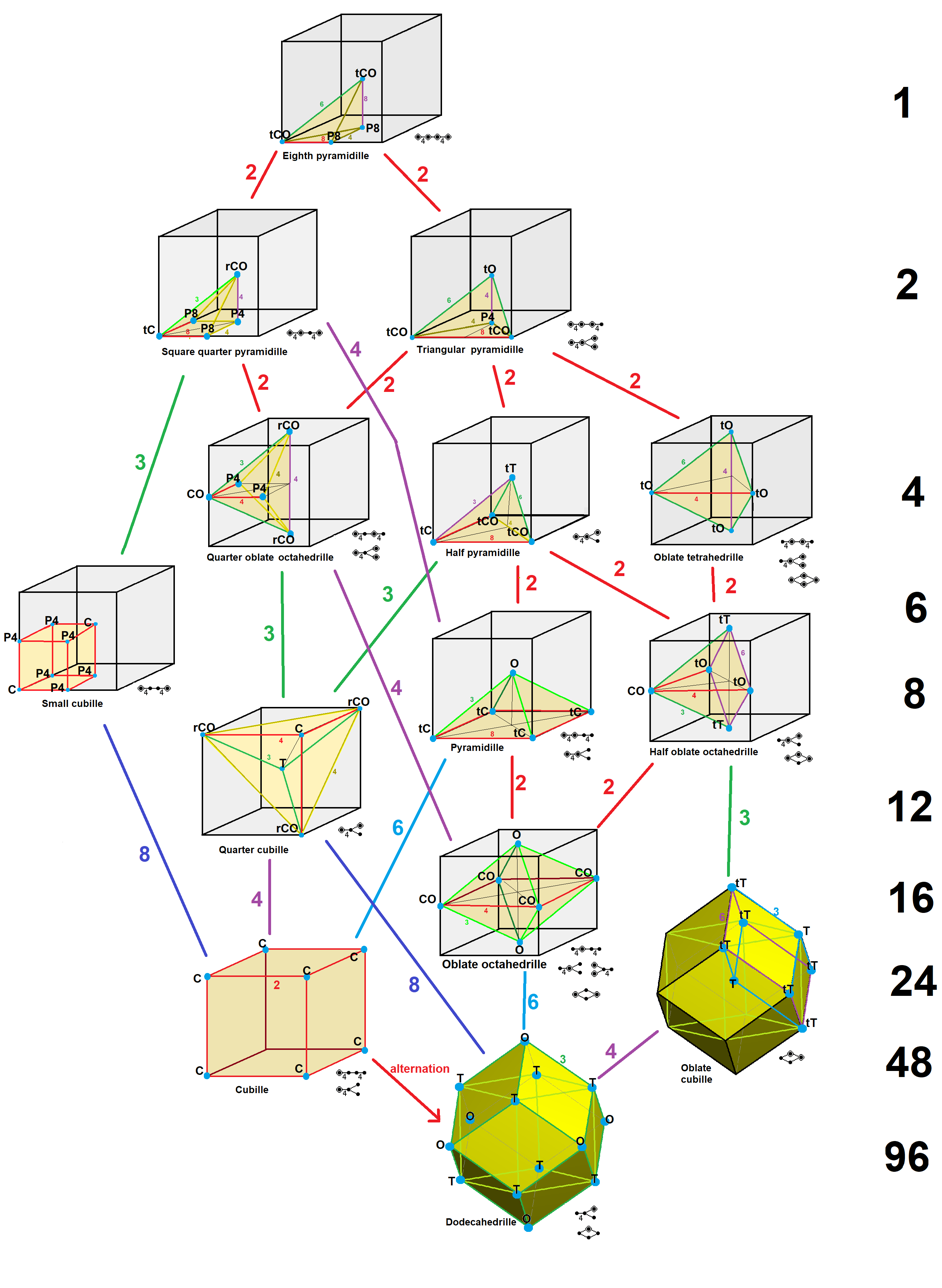
The 13 architectonic or catoptric tessellations, shown as uniform cell centers, and catoptric cells, arranged as multiples of the smallest cell on top.

In geometry, John Horton Conway defines architectonic and catoptric tessellations as the uniform tessellations (or honeycombs) of Euclidean 3-space with prime space groups and their duals, as three-dimensional analogue of the Platonic, Archimedean, and Catalan tiling of the plane. The singular vertex figure of an architectonic tessellation is the dual of the cell of the corresponding catoptric tessellation, and vice versa. The cubille is the only Platonic (regular) tessellation of 3-space, and is self-dual. There are other uniform honeycombs constructed as gyrations or prismatic stacks (and their duals) which are excluded from these categories.

== Enumeration ==
The pairs of architectonic and catoptric tessellations are listed below with their symmetry group. These tessellations only represent four symmetry space groups, and also all within the cubic crystal system. Many of these tessellations can be defined in multiple symmetry groups, so in each case the highest symmetry is expressed.

Ref. indices	Symmetry	Architectonic tessellation			Catoptric tessellation		
Ref. indices	Symmetry	Name Coxeter diagram Image	Vertex figure Image	Cells	Name	Cell	Vertex figures
J_{11,15} A_{1} W_{1} G_{22} δ_{4}	nc [4,3,4]	Cubille (Cubic honeycomb)	Octahedron,		Cubille	Cube,	
J_{12,32} A_{15} W_{14} G_{7} t_{1}δ_{4}	nc [4,3,4]	Cuboctahedrille (Rectified cubic honeycomb)	Cuboid,		Oblate octahedrille	Isosceles square bipyramid	,
J_{13} A_{14} W_{15} G_{8} t_{0,1}δ_{4}	nc [4,3,4]	Truncated cubille (Truncated cubic honeycomb)	Isosceles square pyramid		Pyramidille	Isosceles square pyramid	,
J_{14} A_{17} W_{12} G_{9} t_{0,2}δ_{4}	nc [4,3,4]	2-RCO-trille (Cantellated cubic honeycomb)	Wedge		Quarter oblate octahedrille	irr. Triangular bipyramid	,,
J_{16} A_{3} W_{2} G_{28} t_{1,2}δ_{4}	bc [[4,3,4]]	Truncated octahedrille (Bitruncated cubic honeycomb)	Tetragonal disphenoid		Oblate tetrahedrille	Tetragonal disphenoid	
J_{17} A_{18} W_{13} G_{25} t_{0,1,2}δ_{4}	nc [4,3,4]	n-tCO-trille (Cantitruncated cubic honeycomb)	Mirrored sphenoid		Triangular pyramidille	Mirrored sphenoid	,,
J_{18} A_{19} W_{19} G_{20} t_{0,1,3}δ_{4}	nc [4,3,4]	1-RCO-trille (Runcitruncated cubic honeycomb)	Trapezoidal pyramid		Square quarter pyramidille	Irr. pyramid	,,,
J_{19} A_{22} W_{18} G_{27} t_{0,1,2,3}δ_{4}	bc [[4,3,4]]	b-tCO-trille (Omnitruncated cubic honeycomb)	Phyllic disphenoid		Eighth pyramidille	Phyllic disphenoid	,
J_{21,31,51} A_{2} W_{9} G_{1} hδ_{4}	fc [4,3^{1,1}]	Tetroctahedrille (Tetrahedral-octahedral honeycomb) or	Cuboctahedron,		Dodecahedrille or	Rhombic dodecahedron,	,
J_{22,34} A_{21} W_{17} G_{10} h_{2}δ_{4}	fc [4,3^{1,1}]	truncated tetraoctahedrille (Truncated tetrahedral-octahedral honeycomb) or	Rectangular pyramid		Half oblate octahedrille or	rhombic pyramid	,,
J_{23} A_{16} W_{11} G_{5} h_{3}δ_{4}	fc [4,3^{1,1}]	3-RCO-trille (Cantellated tetrahedral-octahedral honeycomb) or	Truncated triangular pyramid		Quarter cubille	irr. triangular bipyramid	
J_{24} A_{20} W_{16} G_{21} h_{2,3}δ_{4}	fc [4,3^{1,1}]	f-tCO-trille (Cantitruncated tetrahedral-octahedral honeycomb) or	Mirrored sphenoid		Half pyramidille	Mirrored sphenoid	
J_{25,33} A_{13} W_{10} G_{6} qδ_{4}	d [[3^{[4]}]]	Truncated tetrahedrille (Cyclotruncated tetrahedral-octahedral honeycomb) or	Isosceles triangular prism		Oblate cubille	Trigonal trapezohedron	

== Vertex Figures ==
The vertex figures of all architectonic honeycombs, and the dual cells of all catoptric honeycombs are shown below, at the same scale and the same orientation:

== Symmetry ==
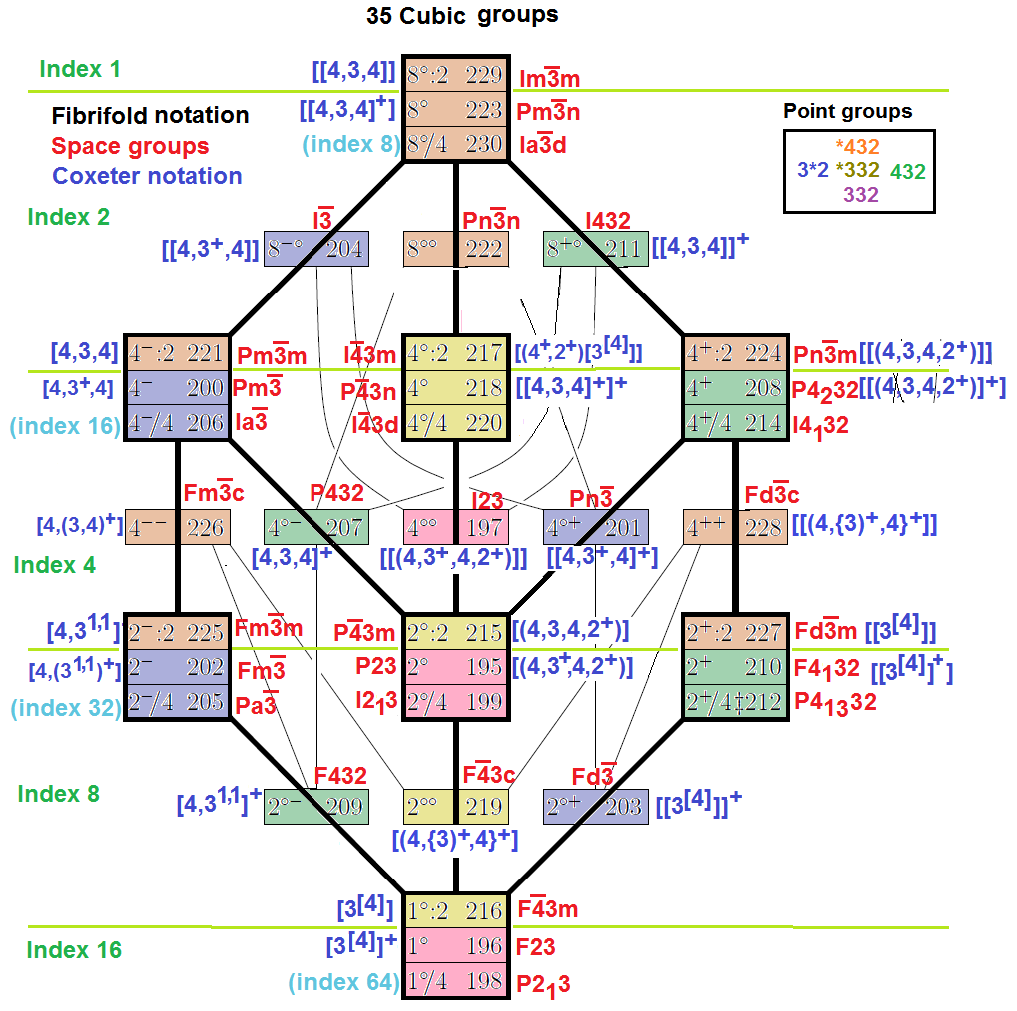
These are four of the 35 cubic space groups

These four symmetry groups are labeled as:

Label	Description	space group Intl symbol	Geometric notation	Coxeter notation	Fibrifold notation
bc	bicubic symmetry or extended cubic symmetry	(221) Im3̅m	I43	[[4,3,4]]	8°:2
nc	normal cubic symmetry	(229) Pm3̅m	P43	[4,3,4]	4^{−}:2
fc	half-cubic symmetry	(225) Fm3̅m	F43	[4,3^{1,1}] = [4,3,4,1^{+}]	2^{−}:2
d	diamond symmetry or extended quarter-cubic symmetry	(227) Fd3̅m	F_{d}4_{n}3	[[3^{[4]}]] = [[1^{+},4,3,4,1^{+}]]	2^{+}:2
