= Trigonal trapezohedral honeycomb =

Space-filling tessellation

Trigonal trapezohedral honeycomb
Type	Dual uniform honeycomb
Coxeter-Dynkin diagrams	
Cell	Trigonal trapezohedron (1/4 of rhombic dodecahedron)
Faces	Rhombus
Space group	Fd3̅m (227)
Coxeter group	${\tilde{A} }_3$×2, 3^{[4]} (double)
vertex figures	|
Dual	Quarter cubic honeycomb
Properties	Cell-transitive, Face-transitive

In geometry, the trigonal trapezohedral honeycomb is a uniform space-filling tessellation (or honeycomb) in Euclidean 3-space. Cells are identical trigonal trapezohedra or rhombohedra. Conway, Burgiel, and Goodman-Strauss call it an oblate cubille.

== Related honeycombs and tilings ==
This honeycomb can be seen as a rhombic dodecahedral honeycomb, with the rhombic dodecahedra dissected with its center into 4 trigonal trapezohedra or rhombohedra.

rhombic dodecahedral honeycomb	Rhombic dodecahedra dissection	Rhombic net

It is analogous to the regular hexagonal being dissectable into 3 rhombi and tiling the plane as a rhombille. The rhombille tiling is actually an orthogonal projection of the trigonal trapezohedral honeycomb. A different orthogonal projection produces the quadrille where the rhombi are distorted into squares.

== Dual tiling ==
It is dual to the quarter cubic honeycomb with tetrahedral and truncated tetrahedral cells:

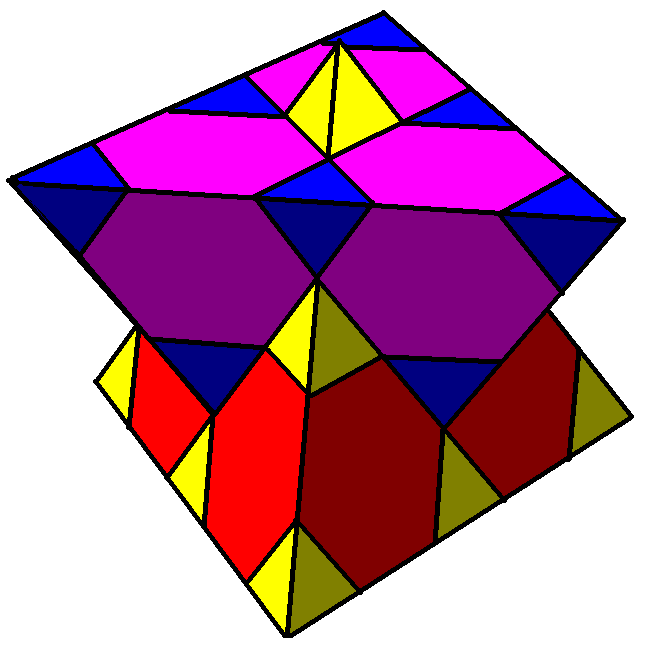

== See also ==
- Architectonic and catoptric tessellation
