= Quarter cubic honeycomb =

Quarter cubic honeycomb
Type	Uniform honeycomb
Family	Truncated simplectic honeycomb Quarter hypercubic honeycomb
Indexing	J_{25,33}, A_{13} W_{10}, G_{6}
Schläfli symbol	t_{0,1}{3^{[4]}} or q{4,3,4}
Coxeter-Dynkin diagram	= =
Cell types	{3,3} (3.6.6)
Face types	{3}, {6}
Vertex figure	(isosceles triangular antiprism)
Space group	Fd3̅m (227)
Coxeter group	${\tilde{A}}_3$×2_{2}, [[3^{[4]}]]
Dual	oblate cubille Cell: (1/4 of rhombic dodecahedron)
Properties	vertex-transitive, edge-transitive

The quarter cubic honeycomb, quarter cubic cellulation or bitruncated alternated cubic honeycomb is a space-filling tessellation (or honeycomb) in Euclidean 3-space. It is composed of tetrahedra and truncated tetrahedra in a ratio of 1:1. It is called "quarter-cubic" because its symmetry unit – the minimal block from which the pattern is developed by reflections – is four times that of the cubic honeycomb.

It is vertex-transitive with 6 truncated tetrahedra and 2 tetrahedra around each vertex.

It is one of the 28 convex uniform honeycombs.

The faces of this honeycomb's cells form four families of parallel planes, each with a 3.6.3.6 tiling.

Its vertex figure is an isosceles antiprism: two equilateral triangles joined by six isosceles triangles.

John Horton Conway calls this honeycomb a truncated tetrahedrille, and its dual oblate cubille.

The vertices and edges represent a Kagome lattice in three dimensions, which is the pyrochlore lattice.

== Construction ==
The quarter cubic honeycomb can be constructed in slab layers of truncated tetrahedra and tetrahedral cells, seen as two trihexagonal tilings. Two tetrahedra are stacked by a vertex and a central inversion. In each trihexagonal tiling, half of the triangles belong to tetrahedra, and half belong to truncated tetrahedra. These slab layers must be stacked with tetrahedra triangles to truncated tetrahedral triangles to construct the uniform quarter cubic honeycomb. Slab layers of hexagonal prisms and triangular prisms can be alternated for elongated honeycombs, but these are also not uniform.

trihexagonal tiling:

== Symmetry ==
Cells can be shown in two different symmetries. The reflection generated form represented by its Coxeter-Dynkin diagram has two colors of truncated cuboctahedra. The symmetry can be doubled by relating the pairs of ringed and unringed nodes of the Coxeter-Dynkin diagram, which can be shown with one colored tetrahedral and truncated tetrahedral cells.

Two uniform colorings
Symmetry	${\tilde{A}}_3$, [3^{[4]}]	${\tilde{A}}_3$×2, [[3^{[4]}]]
Space group	F4̅3m (216)	Fd3̅m (227)
Coloring		
Vertex figure		
Vertex figure symmetry	C_{3v} [3] (*33) order 6	D_{3d} [2^{+},6] (2*3) order 12

== Related polyhedra ==
The subset of hexagonal faces of this honeycomb contains a regular skew apeirohedron {6,6|3}.	Four sets of parallel planes of trihexagonal tilings exist throughout this honeycomb.

This honeycomb is one of five distinct uniform honeycombs constructed by the ${\tilde{A}}_3$ Coxeter group. The symmetry can be multiplied by the symmetry of rings in the Coxeter–Dynkin diagrams:

A3 honeycombs
Space group	Fibrifold	Square symmetry	Extended symmetry	Extended diagram	Extended group	Honeycomb diagrams
F4̅3m (216)	1^{o}:2	a1	[3^{[4]}]		${\tilde{A}}_3$	(None)
Fm3̅m (225)	2^{−}:2	d2	<[3^{[4]}]> ↔ [4,3^{1,1}]	↔	${\tilde{A}}_3$×2_{1} ↔ ${\tilde{B}}_3$	_{1}, _{2}
Fd3̅m (227)	2^{+}:2	g2	[[3^{[4]}]] or [2^{+}[3^{[4]}]]	↔	${\tilde{A}}_3$×2_{2}	_{3}
Pm3̅m (221)	4^{−}:2	d4	<2[3^{[4]}]> ↔ [4,3,4]	↔	${\tilde{A}}_3$×4_{1} ↔ ${\tilde{C}}_3$	_{4}
I3̅ (204)	8^{−o}	r8	[4[3^{[4]}]]^{+} ↔ [[4,3^{+},4]]	↔	½${\tilde{A}}_3$×8 ↔ ½${\tilde{C}}_3$×2	_{(*)}
Im3̅m (229)	8^{o}:2	r8	[4[3^{[4]}]] ↔ [[4,3,4]]	↔	${\tilde{A}}_3$×8 ↔ ${\tilde{C}}_3$×2	_{5}

C3 honeycombs
Space group	Fibrifold	Extended symmetry	Extended diagram	Order	Honeycombs
Pm3̅m (221)	4^{−}:2	[4,3,4]		×1	_{1}, _{2}, _{3}, _{4}, _{5}, _{6}
Fm3̅m (225)	2^{−}:2	[1^{+},4,3,4] ↔ [4,3^{1,1}]	↔	Half	_{7}, _{11}, _{12}, _{13}
I4̅3m (217)	4^{o}:2	[[(4,3,4,2^{+})]]		Half × 2	_{(7)},
Fd3̅m (227)	2^{+}:2	[[1^{+},4,3,4,1^{+}]] ↔ [[3^{[4]}]]	↔	Quarter × 2	_{10},
Im3̅m (229)	8^{o}:2	[[4,3,4]]		×2	_{(1)}, _{8}, _{9}

The Quarter cubic honeycomb is related to a matrix of 3-dimensional honeycombs: q{2p,4,2q}

Euclidean/hyperbolic(paracompact/noncompact) quarter honeycombs q{p,3,q}
p \ q	4	6	8	... ∞
4	q{4,3,4} ↔ ↔	q{4,3,6} ↔ ↔	q{4,3,8} ↔	q{4,3,∞} ↔
6	q{6,3,4} ↔ ↔	q{6,3,6} ↔	q{6,3,8} ↔	q{6,3,∞} ↔
8	q{8,3,4} ↔	q{8,3,6} ↔	q{8,3,8} ↔	q{8,3,∞} ↔
... ∞	q{∞,3,4} ↔	q{∞,3,6} ↔	q{∞,3,8} ↔	q{∞,3,∞} ↔

== See also ==
- Truncated simplectic honeycomb
- Triakis truncated tetrahedral honeycomb
- Architectonic and catoptric tessellation

Fundamental convex regular and uniform honeycombs in dimensions 2–9
Space	Family	${\tilde{A}}_{n-1}$	${\tilde{C}}_{n-1}$	${\tilde{B}}_{n-1}$	${\tilde{D}}_{n-1}$	${\tilde{G}}_2$ / ${\tilde{F}}_4$ / ${\tilde{E}}_{n-1}$
E^{2}	Uniform tiling	0_{[3]}	δ_{3}	hδ_{3}	qδ_{3}	Hexagonal
E^{3}	Uniform convex honeycomb	0_{[4]}	δ_{4}	hδ_{4}	qδ_{4}	
E^{4}	Uniform 4-honeycomb	0_{[5]}	δ_{5}	hδ_{5}	qδ_{5}	24-cell honeycomb
E^{5}	Uniform 5-honeycomb	0_{[6]}	δ_{6}	hδ_{6}	qδ_{6}	
E^{6}	Uniform 6-honeycomb	0_{[7]}	δ_{7}	hδ_{7}	qδ_{7}	2_{22}
E^{7}	Uniform 7-honeycomb	0_{[8]}	δ_{8}	hδ_{8}	qδ_{8}	1_{33} • 3_{31}
E^{8}	Uniform 8-honeycomb	0_{[9]}	δ_{9}	hδ_{9}	qδ_{9}	1_{52} • 2_{51} • 5_{21}
E^{9}	Uniform 9-honeycomb	0_{[10]}	δ_{10}	hδ_{10}	qδ_{10}	
E^{10}	Uniform 10-honeycomb	0_{[11]}	δ_{11}	hδ_{11}	qδ_{11}	
E^{n−1}	Uniform (n−1)-honeycomb	0_{[n]}	δ_{n}	hδ_{n}	qδ_{n}	1_{k2} • 2_{k1} • k_{21}
