= Cubic honeycomb =

Only regular space-filling tessellation of the cube

- Partial view of a cubic honeycomb
- Type: Regular honeycomb
- Indexing: J_{11,15}, A_{1} W_{1}, G_{22}
- Schläfli symbol: $\{4,3,4\}$
- Cell type: cube
- Duality: self-dual

The cubic honeycomb or cubic cellulation is the only proper regular space-filling tessellation (or honeycomb) in Euclidean 3-space made up of cubic cells. It has 4 cubes around every edge, and 8 cubes around each vertex. Its vertex figure is a regular octahedron. It is a self-dual tessellation with Schläfli symbol {4,3,4}. John Horton Conway called this honeycomb a cubille.

A geometric honeycomb is a space-filling of polyhedral or higher-dimensional cells, so that there are no gaps. It is an example of the more general mathematical tiling or tessellation in any number of dimensions.

Honeycombs are usually constructed in ordinary Euclidean ("flat") space, like the convex uniform honeycombs. They may also be constructed in non-Euclidean spaces, such as hyperbolic uniform honeycombs. Any finite uniform polytope can be projected to its circumsphere to form a uniform honeycomb in spherical space.

== Description ==
The cubic honeycomb is a space-filling or three-dimensional tessellation consisting of many cubes that attach each other to the faces; the cube is known as cell of a honeycomb. The parallelepiped is the member of a parallelohedron, generated from three line segments that are not all parallel to a common plane. The cube is the special case of a parallelepiped for having the most symmetric form, generated by three perpendicular unit-length line segments. In three-dimensional space, the cubic honeycomb is the only proper regular space-filling tessellation. It is self-dual.

== Related honeycombs ==
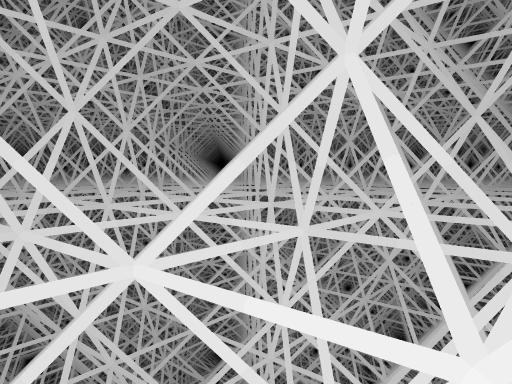
Rectified cubic honeycomb

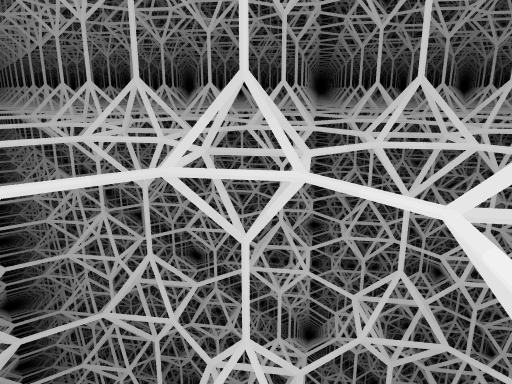
Truncated cubic tiling

The rectified cubic honeycomb or rectified cubic cellulation is a uniform space-filling tessellation (or honeycomb) in Euclidean 3-space. It is composed of octahedra and cuboctahedra in a ratio of 1:1, with a square prism vertex figure. John Horton Conway calls this honeycomb a cuboctahedrille, and its dual an oblate octahedrille.

The truncated cubic honeycomb or truncated cubic cellulation is a uniform space-filling tessellation (or honeycomb) in Euclidean 3-space. It is composed of truncated cubes and octahedra in a ratio of 1:1, with an isosceles square pyramid vertex figure. John Horton Conway calls this honeycomb a truncated cubille, and its dual pyramidille.

The bitruncated cubic honeycomb shown here in relation to a cubic honeycomb

The bitruncated cubic honeycomb is a space-filling tessellation (or honeycomb) in Euclidean 3-space made up of truncated octahedra (or, equivalently, bitruncated cubes). It has four truncated octahedra around each vertex, in a tetragonal disphenoid vertex figure. Being composed entirely of truncated octahedra, it is cell-transitive. It is also edge-transitive, with 2 hexagons and one square on each edge, and vertex-transitive. It is one of 28 uniform honeycombs. John Horton Conway calls this honeycomb a truncated octahedrille in his Architectonic and catoptric tessellation list, with its dual called an oblate tetrahedrille, also called a disphenoid tetrahedral honeycomb. Although a regular tetrahedron can not tessellate space alone, this dual has identical disphenoid tetrahedron cells with isosceles triangle faces.

The alternated bitruncated cubic honeycomb or bisnub cubic honeycomb is non-uniform, with the highest symmetry construction reflecting an alternation of the uniform bitruncated cubic honeycomb. A lower-symmetry construction involves regular icosahedra paired with golden icosahedra (with 8 equilateral triangles paired with 12 golden triangles). There are three constructions from three related Coxeter diagrams:,, and. These have symmetry [4,3^{+},4], [4,(3^{1,1})^{+}] and [3^{[4]}]^{+} respectively. The first and last symmetry can be doubled as [[4,3^{+},4]] and [[3^{[4]}]]^{+}. This honeycomb is represented in the boron atoms of the α-rhombohedral crystal. The centers of the icosahedra are located at the fcc positions of the lattice.

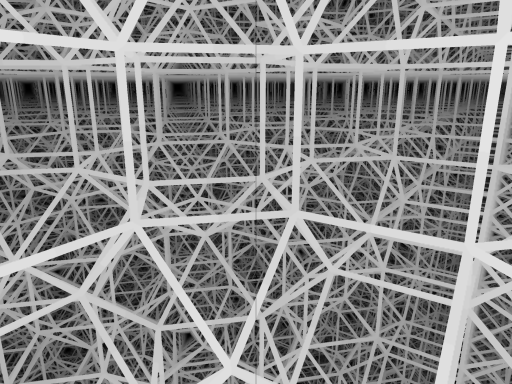
Cantellated cubic tiling

The cantellated cubic honeycomb or cantellated cubic cellulation is a uniform space-filling tessellation (or honeycomb) in Euclidean 3-space. It is composed of rhombicuboctahedra, cuboctahedra, and cubes in a ratio of 1:1:3, with a wedge vertex figure. John Horton Conway calls this honeycomb a 2-RCO-trille, and its dual quarter oblate octahedrille.

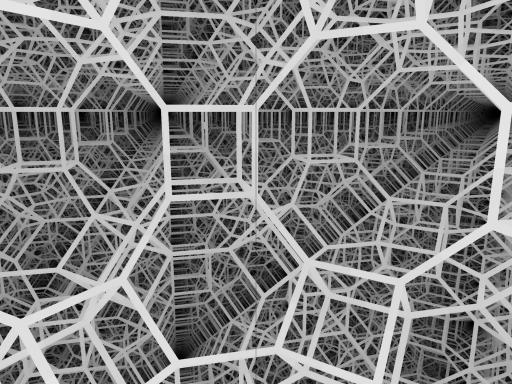
Cantitruncated cubic tiling

The cantitruncated cubic honeycomb or cantitruncated cubic cellulation is a uniform space-filling tessellation (or honeycomb) in Euclidean 3-space, made up of truncated cuboctahedra, truncated octahedra, and cubes in a ratio of 1:1:3, with a mirrored sphenoid vertex figure. John Horton Conway calls this honeycomb a n-tCO-trille, and its dual triangular pyramidille. Its dual of the cantitruncated cubic honeycomb is called a triangular pyramidille, with Coxeter diagram,. These honeycomb cells represent the fundamental domains of ${\tilde{B}}_3$ symmetry. A cell can be as 1/24 of a translational cube with vertices positioned: taking two corners, ne face center, and the cube center. The edge colors and labels specify how many cells exist around the edge.

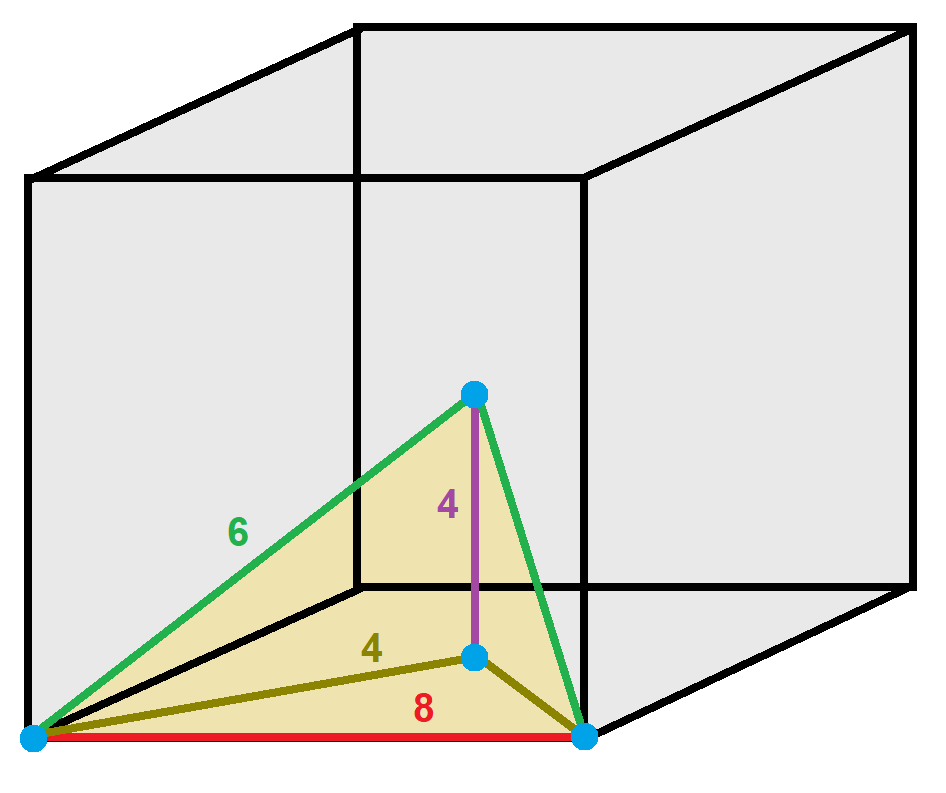

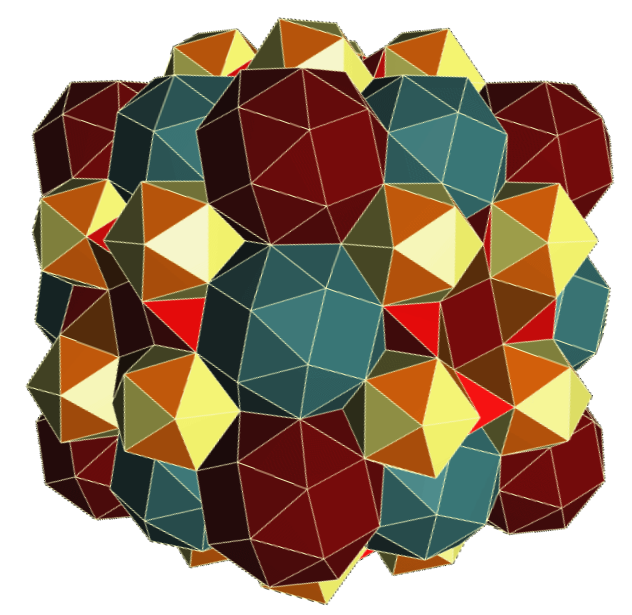
The alternated cantitruncated cubic honeycomb

The alternated cantitruncated cubic honeycomb or snub rectified cubic honeycomb contains three types of cells: snub cubes, icosahedra (with T_{h} symmetry), tetrahedra (as tetragonal disphenoids), and new tetrahedral cells created at the gaps.
Although it is not uniform, constructionally it can be given as Coxeter diagrams or. Despite being non-uniform, there is a near-miss version with two edge lengths shown below, one of which is around 4.3% greater than the other. The snub cubes in this case are uniform, but the rest of the cells are not.

The cantic snub cubic honeycomb is constructed by snubbing the truncated octahedra in a way that leaves only rectangles from the cubes (square prisms). It is not uniform but it can be represented as Coxeter diagram. It has rhombicuboctahedra (with T_{h} symmetry), icosahedra (with T_{h} symmetry), and triangular prisms (as C_{2v}-symmetry wedges) filling the gaps.

The runcitruncated cubic honeycomb or runcitruncated cubic cellulation is a uniform space-filling tessellation (or honeycomb) in Euclidean 3-space. It is composed of rhombicuboctahedra, truncated cubes, octagonal prisms, and cubes in a ratio of 1:1:3:3, with an isosceles-trapezoidal pyramid vertex figure. Its name is derived from its Coxeter diagram, with three ringed nodes representing 3 active mirrors in the Wythoff construction from its relation to the regular cubic honeycomb. John Horton Conway calls this honeycomb a 1-RCO-trille, and its dual square quarter pyramidille. Its dual is square quarter pyramidille, with Coxeter diagram. Faces exist in 3 of 4 hyperplanes of the [4,3,4], ${\tilde{C}}_3$ Coxeter group. Cells are irregular pyramids and can be seen as 1/24 of a cube, using one corner, one mid-edge point, two face centers, and the cube center.

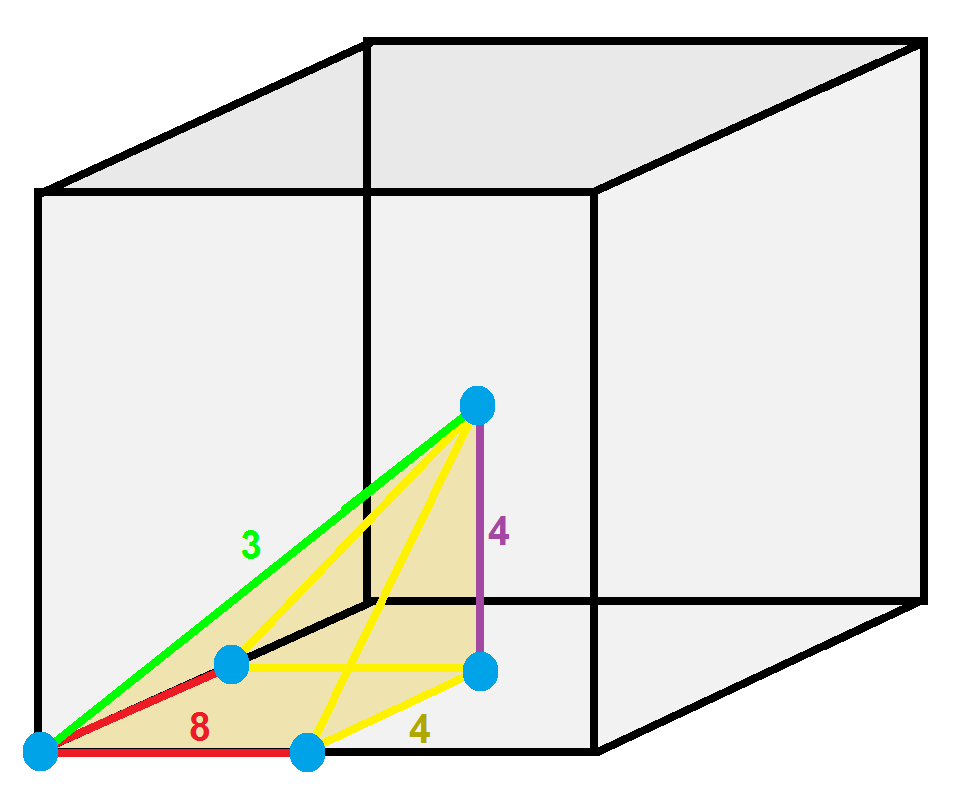

An alternated omnitruncated cubic honeycomb or omnisnub cubic honeycomb can be constructed by alternation of the omnitruncated cubic honeycomb, although it can not be made uniform, but it can be given Coxeter diagram: and has symmetry [[4,3,4]]^{+}. It makes snub cubes from the truncated cuboctahedra, square antiprisms from the octagonal prisms, and creates new tetrahedral cells from the gaps. Its dual is a space-filling honeycomb constructed as the dual of the alternated omnitruncated cubic honeycomb. The 24 cells fit around a vertex, making a chiral octahedral symmetry that can be stacked in all 3-dimensions:

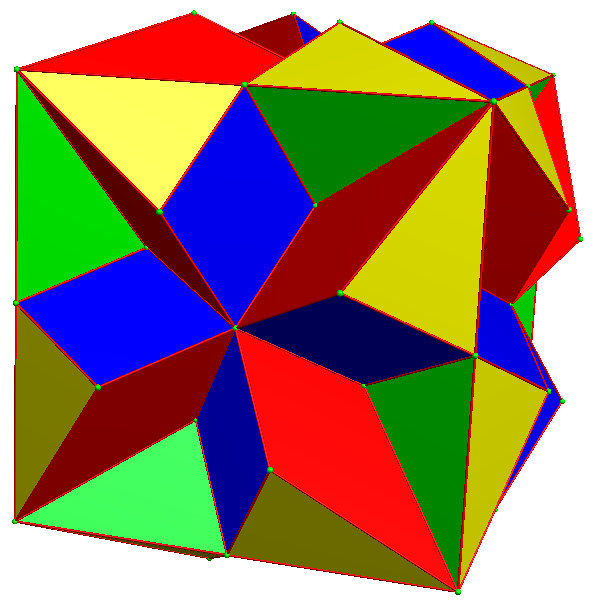

The runcic cantitruncated cubic honeycomb or runcic cantitruncated cubic cellulation is constructed by removing alternating long rectangles from the octagons and is not uniform, but it can be represented as Coxeter diagram. It has rhombicuboctahedra (with T_{h} symmetry), snub cubes, two kinds of cubes: square prisms and rectangular trapezoprisms (topologically equivalent to a cube but with D_{2d} symmetry), and triangular prisms (as C_{2v}-symmetry wedges) filling the gaps.

The biorthosnub cubic honeycomb is constructed by removing alternating long rectangles from the octagons orthogonally and is not uniform, but it can be represented as Coxeter diagram. It has rhombicuboctahedra (with T_{h} symmetry) and two kinds of cubes: square prisms and rectangular trapezoprisms (topologically equivalent to a cube but with D_{2d} symmetry).

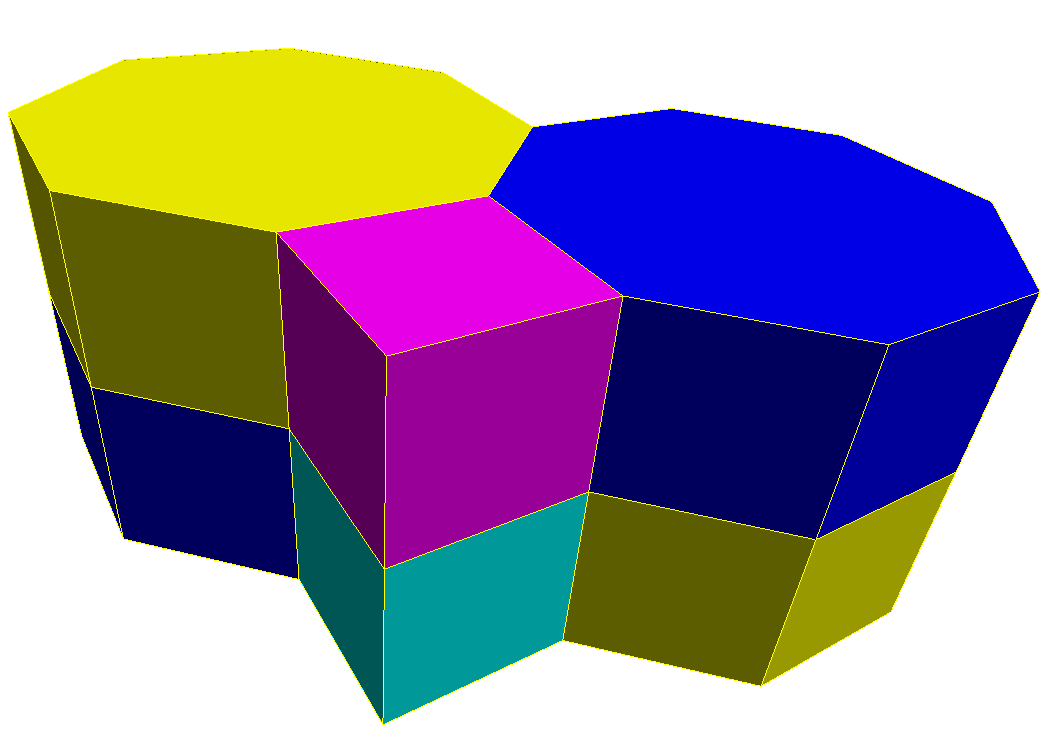
Truncated square prismatic honeycomb

The truncated square prismatic honeycomb or tomo-square prismatic cellulation is a space-filling tessellation (or honeycomb) in Euclidean 3-space. It is composed of octagonal prisms and cubes in a ratio of 1:1. It is constructed from a truncated square tiling extruded into prisms. It is one of 28 convex uniform honeycombs.

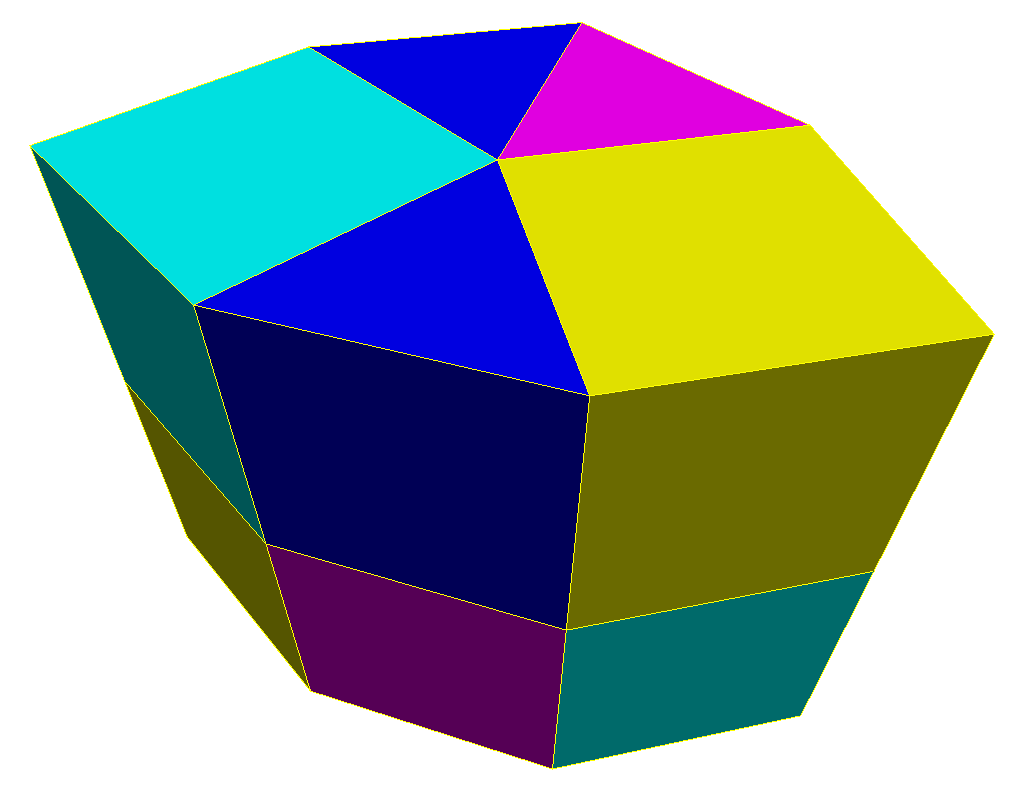
Snub square prismatic honeycomb

The snub square prismatic honeycomb or simo-square prismatic cellulation is a space-filling tessellation (or honeycomb) in Euclidean 3-space. It is composed of cubes and triangular prisms in a ratio of 1:2. It is constructed from a snub square tiling extruded into prisms. It is one of 28 convex uniform honeycombs.

A snub square antiprismatic honeycomb can be constructed by alternation of the truncated square prismatic honeycomb, although it can not be made uniform, but it can be given Coxeter diagram: and has symmetry [4,4,2,∞]^{+}. It makes square antiprisms from the octagonal prisms, tetrahedra (as tetragonal disphenoids) from the cubes, and two tetrahedra from the triangular bipyramids.

== See also ==
- Architectonic and catoptric tessellation
- Alternated cubic honeycomb
- List of regular polytopes
- Order-5 cubic honeycomb A hyperbolic cubic honeycomb with 5 cubes per edge
- Snub (geometry)
- Voxel

Fundamental convex regular and uniform honeycombs in dimensions 2–9
Space	Family	${\tilde{A}}_{n-1}$	${\tilde{C}}_{n-1}$	${\tilde{B}}_{n-1}$	${\tilde{D}}_{n-1}$	${\tilde{G}}_2$ / ${\tilde{F}}_4$ / ${\tilde{E}}_{n-1}$
E^{2}	Uniform tiling	0_{[3]}	δ_{3}	hδ_{3}	qδ_{3}	Hexagonal
E^{3}	Uniform convex honeycomb	0_{[4]}	δ_{4}	hδ_{4}	qδ_{4}	
E^{4}	Uniform 4-honeycomb	0_{[5]}	δ_{5}	hδ_{5}	qδ_{5}	24-cell honeycomb
E^{5}	Uniform 5-honeycomb	0_{[6]}	δ_{6}	hδ_{6}	qδ_{6}	
E^{6}	Uniform 6-honeycomb	0_{[7]}	δ_{7}	hδ_{7}	qδ_{7}	2_{22}
E^{7}	Uniform 7-honeycomb	0_{[8]}	δ_{8}	hδ_{8}	qδ_{8}	1_{33} • 3_{31}
E^{8}	Uniform 8-honeycomb	0_{[9]}	δ_{9}	hδ_{9}	qδ_{9}	1_{52} • 2_{51} • 5_{21}
E^{9}	Uniform 9-honeycomb	0_{[10]}	δ_{10}	hδ_{10}	qδ_{10}	
E^{10}	Uniform 10-honeycomb	0_{[11]}	δ_{11}	hδ_{11}	qδ_{11}	
E^{n−1}	Uniform (n−1)-honeycomb	0_{[n]}	δ_{n}	hδ_{n}	qδ_{n}	1_{k2} • 2_{k1} • k_{21}
