= Tetrahedral-octahedral honeycomb =

Quasiregular space-filling tesselation

Alternated cubic honeycomb
Type	Uniform honeycomb
Family	Alternated hypercubic honeycomb Simplectic honeycomb
Indexing	J_{21,31,51}, A_{2} W_{9}, G_{1}
Schläfli symbols	h{4,3,4} {3^{[4]}} ht_{0,3}{4,3,4} h{4,4}h{∞} ht_{0,2}{4,4}h{∞} h{∞}h{∞}h{∞} s{∞}s{∞}s{∞}
Coxeter diagrams	= = = =
Cells	{3,3} {3,4}
Faces	triangle {3}
Edge figure	[{3,3}.{3,4}]^{2} (rectangle)
Vertex figure	(cuboctahedron)
Symmetry group	Fm3̅m (225)
Coxeter group	${\tilde{B}}_3$, [4,3^{1,1}]
Dual	Dodecahedrille rhombic dodecahedral honeycomb Cell:
Properties	vertex-transitive, edge-transitive, quasiregular honeycomb

The tetrahedral-octahedral honeycomb, alternated cubic honeycomb is a quasiregular space-filling tessellation (or honeycomb) in Euclidean 3-space. It is composed of alternating regular octahedra and tetrahedra in a ratio of 1:2.

Other names include half cubic honeycomb, half cubic cellulation, or tetragonal disphenoidal cellulation. John Horton Conway called this honeycomb a tetroctahedrille, and its dual a dodecahedrille.

R. Buckminster Fuller combined the two words octahedron and tetrahedron into octet truss, a rhombohedron consisting of one octahedron (or two square pyramids) and two opposite tetrahedra.

It is vertex-transitive with 8 tetrahedra and 6 octahedra around each vertex. It is edge-transitive with 2 tetrahedra and 2 octahedra alternating on each edge. The vertex locations of the tetrahedral-octahedral honeycomb produce the face-centered cubic (FCC) lattice in crystals.

A geometric honeycomb is a space-filling of polyhedral or higher-dimensional cells, so that there are no gaps. It is an example of the more general mathematical tiling or tessellation in any number of dimensions.

Honeycombs are usually constructed in ordinary Euclidean ("flat") space, like the convex uniform honeycombs. They may also be constructed in non-Euclidean spaces, such as hyperbolic uniform honeycombs. Any finite uniform polytope can be projected to its circumsphere to form a uniform honeycomb in spherical space.

It is part of an infinite family of uniform honeycombs called alternated hypercubic honeycombs, formed as an alternation of a hypercubic honeycomb and being composed of demihypercube and cross-polytope facets. It is also part of another infinite family of uniform honeycombs called simplectic honeycombs.

In this case of 3-space, the cubic honeycomb is alternated, reducing the cubic cells to tetrahedra, and the deleted vertices create octahedral voids. As such it can be represented by an extended Schläfli symbol h{4,3,4} as containing half the vertices of the {4,3,4} cubic honeycomb.

There is a similar honeycomb called gyrated tetrahedral-octahedral honeycomb which has layers rotated 60 degrees so half the edges have neighboring rather than alternating tetrahedra and octahedra.

The tetrahedral-octahedral honeycomb can have its symmetry doubled by placing tetrahedra on the octahedral cells, creating a nonuniform honeycomb consisting of tetrahedra and octahedra (as triangular antiprisms). Its vertex figure is an order-3 truncated triakis tetrahedron. This honeycomb is the dual of the triakis truncated tetrahedral honeycomb, with triakis truncated tetrahedral cells.

== Cartesian coordinates ==
For an alternated cubic honeycomb, with edges parallel to the axes and with an edge length of 1, the Cartesian coordinates of the vertices are: (For all integral values: i,j,k with i+j+k even)

(i, j, k)

This diagram shows an exploded view of the cells surrounding each vertex.

== Symmetry ==
There are two reflective constructions and many alternated cubic honeycomb ones; examples:

Symmetry	${\tilde{B}}_3$, [4,3^{1,1}] = ½${\tilde{C}}_3$, [1^{+},4,3,4]	${\tilde{A}}_3$, [3^{[4]}] = ½${\tilde{B}}_3$, [1^{+},4,3^{1,1}]	[[(4,3,4,2^{+})]]	[(4,3,4,2^{+})]
Space group	Fm3̅m (225)	F4̅3m (216)	I4̅3m (217)	P4̅3m (215)
Image				
Types of tetrahedra	1	2	3	4
Coxeter diagram	=	= =		

=== Alternated cubic honeycomb slices ===
The alternated cubic honeycomb can be sliced into sections, where new square faces are created from inside of the octahedron. Each slice will contain up and downward facing square pyramids and tetrahedra sitting on their edges. A second slice direction needs no new faces and includes alternating tetrahedral and octahedral. This slab honeycomb is a scaliform honeycomb rather than uniform because it has nonuniform cells.

=== Projection by folding ===
The alternated cubic honeycomb can be orthogonally projected into the planar square tiling by a geometric folding operation that maps one pairs of mirrors into each other. The projection of the alternated cubic honeycomb creates two offset copies of the square tiling vertex arrangement of the plane:

Coxeter group	${\tilde{A}}_3$	${\tilde{C}}_2$
Coxeter diagram		
Image		
Name	alternated cubic honeycomb	square tiling

== A3/D3 lattice ==
Its vertex arrangement represents an A_{3} lattice or D_{3} lattice. This lattice is known as the face-centered cubic lattice in crystallography and is also referred to as the cubic close packed lattice as its vertices are the centers of a close-packing with equal spheres that achieves the highest possible average density. The tetrahedral-octahedral honeycomb is the 3-dimensional case of a simplectic honeycomb. Its Voronoi cell is a rhombic dodecahedron, the dual of the cuboctahedron vertex figure for the tet-oct honeycomb.

The D^{+}_{3} packing can be constructed by the union of two D_{3} (or A_{3}) lattices. The D^{+}_{n} packing is only a lattice for even dimensions. The kissing number is 2^{2}=4, (2^{n−1} for n<8, 240 for n=8, and 2n(n−1) for n>8).

∪

The A^{*}_{3} or D^{*}_{3} lattice (also called A^{4}_{3} or D^{4}_{3}) can be constructed by the union of all four A_{3} lattices, and is identical to the vertex arrangement of the disphenoid tetrahedral honeycomb, dual honeycomb of the uniform bitruncated cubic honeycomb: It is also the body centered cubic, the union of two cubic honeycombs in dual positions.

∪ ∪ ∪ = dual of = ∪.

The kissing number of the D^{*}_{3} lattice is 8 and its Voronoi tessellation is a bitruncated cubic honeycomb,, containing all truncated octahedral Voronoi cells,.

== Related honeycombs ==
=== C3 honeycombs ===
The [4,3,4],, Coxeter group generates 15 permutations of uniform honeycombs, 9 with distinct geometry including the alternated cubic honeycomb. The expanded cubic honeycomb (also known as the runcinated tesseractic honeycomb) is geometrically identical to the cubic honeycomb.

C3 honeycombs
Space group	Fibrifold	Extended symmetry	Extended diagram	Order	Honeycombs
Pm3̅m (221)	4^{−}:2	[4,3,4]		×1	_{1}, _{2}, _{3}, _{4}, _{5}, _{6}
Fm3̅m (225)	2^{−}:2	[1^{+},4,3,4] ↔ [4,3^{1,1}]	↔	Half	_{7}, _{11}, _{12}, _{13}
I4̅3m (217)	4^{o}:2	[[(4,3,4,2^{+})]]		Half × 2	_{(7)},
Fd3̅m (227)	2^{+}:2	[[1^{+},4,3,4,1^{+}]] ↔ [[3^{[4]}]]	↔	Quarter × 2	_{10},
Im3̅m (229)	8^{o}:2	[[4,3,4]]		×2	_{(1)}, _{8}, _{9}

=== B3 honeycombs ===
The [4,3^{1,1}],, Coxeter group generates 9 permutations of uniform honeycombs, 4 with distinct geometry including the alternated cubic honeycomb.

B3 honeycombs
Space group	Fibrifold	Extended symmetry	Extended diagram	Order	Honeycombs
Fm3̅m (225)	2^{−}:2	[4,3^{1,1}] ↔ [4,3,4,1^{+}]	↔	×1	_{1}, _{2}, _{3}, _{4}
Fm3̅m (225)	2^{−}:2	<[1^{+},4,3^{1,1}]> ↔ <[3^{[4]}]>	↔	×2	_{(1)}, _{(3)}
Pm3̅m (221)	4^{−}:2	<[4,3^{1,1}]>		×2	_{5}, _{6}, _{7}, _{(6)}, _{9}, _{10}, _{11}

=== A3 honeycombs ===
This honeycomb is one of five distinct uniform honeycombs constructed by the ${\tilde{A}}_3$ Coxeter group. The symmetry can be multiplied by the symmetry of rings in the Coxeter–Dynkin diagrams:

A3 honeycombs
Space group	Fibrifold	Square symmetry	Extended symmetry	Extended diagram	Extended group	Honeycomb diagrams
F4̅3m (216)	1^{o}:2	a1	[3^{[4]}]		${\tilde{A}}_3$	(None)
Fm3̅m (225)	2^{−}:2	d2	<[3^{[4]}]> ↔ [4,3^{1,1}]	↔	${\tilde{A}}_3$×2_{1} ↔ ${\tilde{B}}_3$	_{1}, _{2}
Fd3̅m (227)	2^{+}:2	g2	[[3^{[4]}]] or [2^{+}[3^{[4]}]]	↔	${\tilde{A}}_3$×2_{2}	_{3}
Pm3̅m (221)	4^{−}:2	d4	<2[3^{[4]}]> ↔ [4,3,4]	↔	${\tilde{A}}_3$×4_{1} ↔ ${\tilde{C}}_3$	_{4}
I3̅ (204)	8^{−o}	r8	[4[3^{[4]}]]^{+} ↔ [[4,3^{+},4]]	↔	½${\tilde{A}}_3$×8 ↔ ½${\tilde{C}}_3$×2	_{(*)}
Im3̅m (229)	8^{o}:2	r8	[4[3^{[4]}]] ↔ [[4,3,4]]	↔	${\tilde{A}}_3$×8 ↔ ${\tilde{C}}_3$×2	_{5}

=== Quasiregular honeycombs ===
Quasiregular polychora and honeycombs: h{4,p,q}
Space	Finite	Affine	Compact	Paracompact		
Schläfli symbol	h{4,3,3}	h{4,3,4}	h{4,3,5}	h{4,3,6}	h{4,4,3}	h{4,4,4}
Schläfli symbol	$\left\{3,{3\atop3}\right\}$	$\left\{3,{4\atop3}\right\}$	$\left\{3,{5\atop3}\right\}$	$\left\{3,{6\atop3}\right\}$	$\left\{4,{4\atop3}\right\}$	$\left\{4,{4\atop4}\right\}$
Coxeter diagram	↔	↔	↔	↔	↔	↔
Coxeter diagram	↔					↔
Image						
Vertex figure r{p,3}						

=== Cantic cubic honeycomb ===
Cantic cubic honeycomb
Type	Uniform honeycomb
Schläfli symbol	h_{2}{4,3,4}
Coxeter diagrams	= =
Cells	t{3,4} r{4,3} t{3,3}
Faces	triangle {3} square {4} hexagon {6}
Vertex figure	rectangular pyramid
Coxeter groups	[4,3^{1,1}], ${\tilde{B}}_3$ [3^{[4]}], ${\tilde{A}}_3$
Symmetry group	Fm3̅m (225)
Dual	half oblate octahedrille Cell:
Properties	vertex-transitive

The cantic cubic honeycomb, cantic cubic cellulation or truncated half cubic honeycomb is a uniform space-filling tessellation (or honeycomb) in Euclidean 3-space. It is composed of truncated octahedra, cuboctahedra and truncated tetrahedra in a ratio of 1:1:2. Its vertex figure is a rectangular pyramid.

John Horton Conway calls this honeycomb a truncated tetraoctahedrille, and its dual half oblate octahedrille.

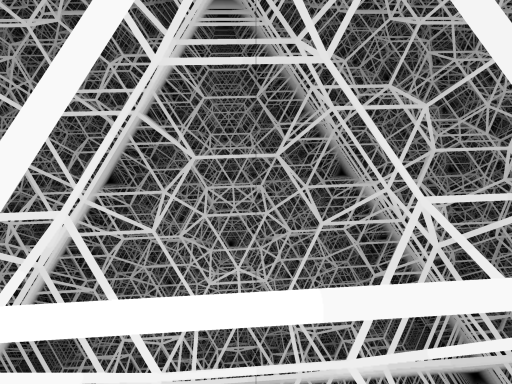
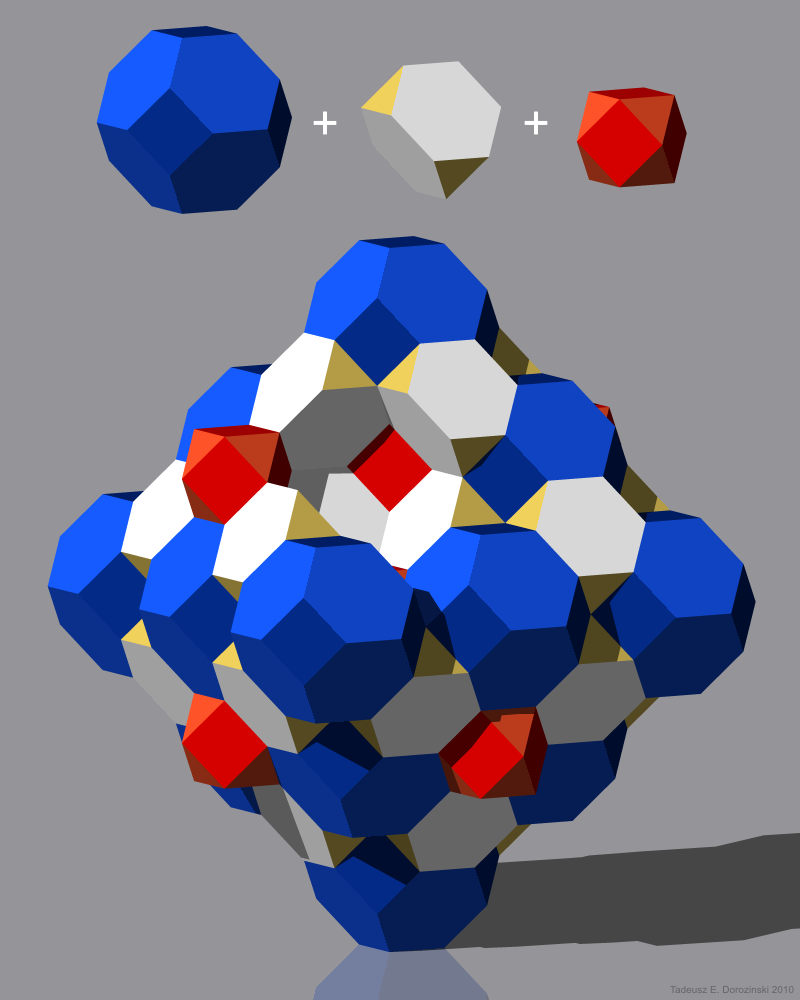

==== Symmetry ====
It has two different uniform constructions. The ${\tilde{A}}_3$ construction can be seen with alternately colored truncated tetrahedra.

Symmetry	[4,3^{1,1}], ${\tilde{B}}_3$ =<[3^{[4]}]>	[3^{[4]}], ${\tilde{A}}_3$
Space group	Fm3̅m (225)	F4̅3m (216)
Coloring		
Coxeter	=	=
Vertex figure		

==== Related honeycombs ====
It is related to the cantellated cubic honeycomb. Rhombicuboctahedra are reduced to truncated octahedra, and cubes are reduced to truncated tetrahedra.

cantellated cubic	Cantic cubic
,, rr{4,3}, r{4,3}, {4,3}	,, t{3,4}, r{4,3}, t{3,3}

=== Runcic cubic honeycomb ===
Runcic cubic honeycomb
Type	Uniform honeycomb
Schläfli symbol	h_{3}{4,3,4}
Coxeter diagrams	=
Cells	rr{4,3} {4,3} {3,3}
Faces	triangle {3} square {4}
Vertex figure	triangular frustum
Coxeter group	${\tilde{B}}_4$, [4,3^{1,1}]
Symmetry group	Fm3̅m (225)
Dual	quarter cubille Cell:
Properties	vertex-transitive

The runcic cubic honeycomb or runcic cubic cellulation is a uniform space-filling tessellation (or honeycomb) in Euclidean 3-space. It is composed of rhombicuboctahedra, cubes, and tetrahedra in a ratio of 1:1:2. Its vertex figure is a triangular frustum, with a tetrahedron on one end, cube on the opposite end, and three rhombicuboctahedra around the trapezoidal sides.

John Horton Conway calls this honeycomb a 3-RCO-trille, and its dual quarter cubille.

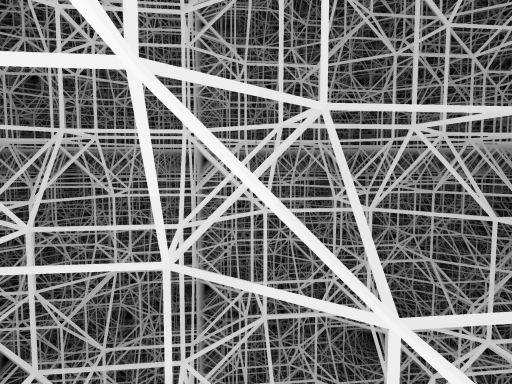
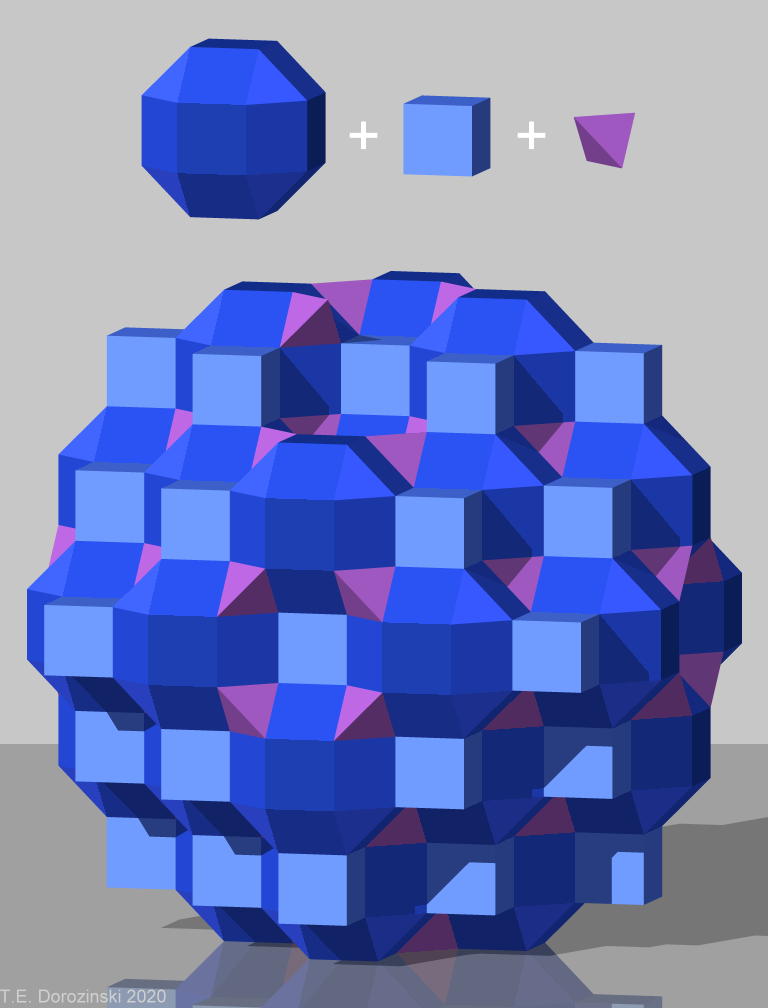

==== Quarter cubille ====
The dual of a runcic cubic honeycomb is called a quarter cubille, with Coxeter diagram, with faces in 2 of 4 hyperplanes of the ${\tilde{B}}_4$, [4,3^{1,1}] symmetry fundamental domain.

Cells can be seen as 1/4 of dissected cube, using 4 vertices and the center. Four cells exist around 6 edges, and 3 cells around 3 edges.

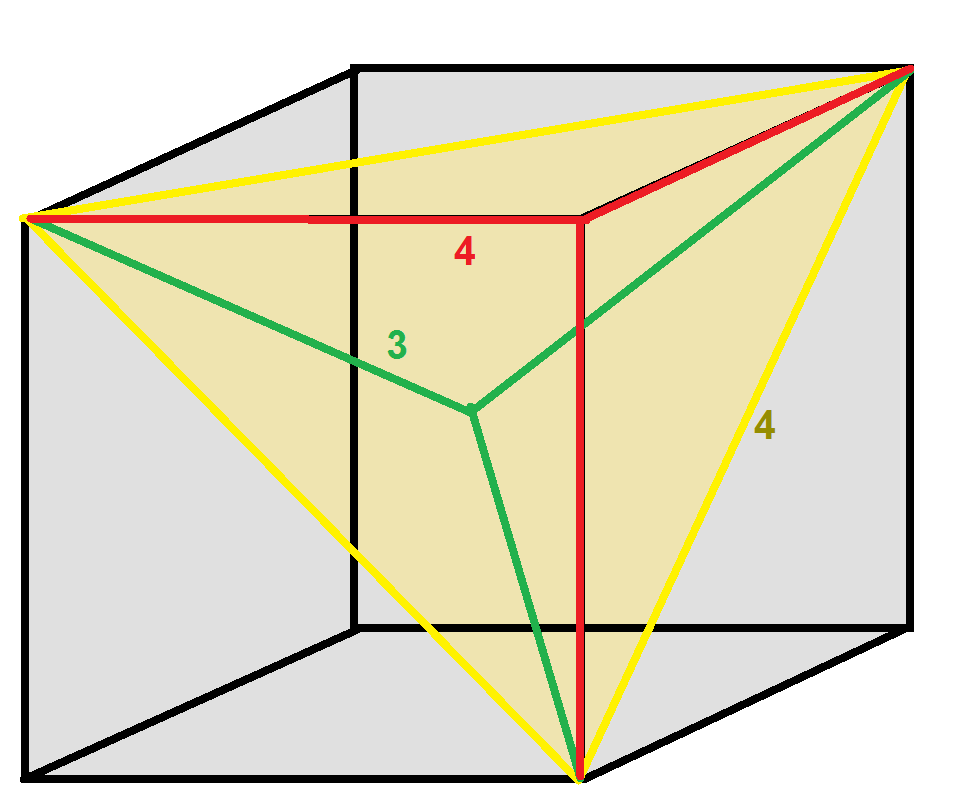

==== Related honeycombs ====
It is related to the runcinated cubic honeycomb, with quarter of the cubes alternated into tetrahedra, and half expanded into rhombicuboctahedra.

Runcinated cubic	Runcic cubic =
{4,3}, {4,3}, {4,3}, {4,3},,,	h{4,3}, rr{4,3}, {4,3},,

This honeycomb can be divided on truncated square tiling planes, using the octagons centers of the rhombicuboctahedra, creating square cupolae. This scaliform honeycomb is represented by Coxeter diagram, and symbol s_{3}{2,4,4}, with coxeter notation symmetry [2^{+},4,4].

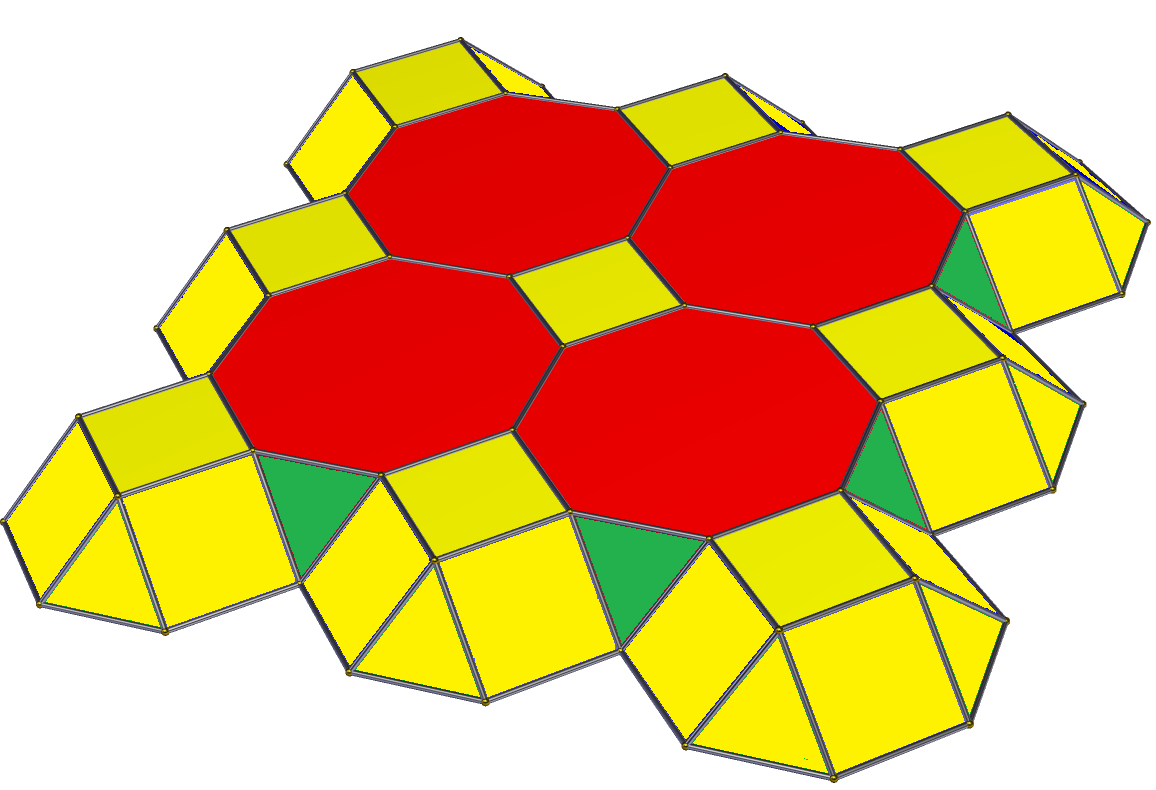
.

=== Runcicantic cubic honeycomb ===
Runcicantic cubic honeycomb
Type	Uniform honeycomb
Schläfli symbol	h_{2,3}{4,3,4}
Coxeter diagrams	=
Cells	tr{4,3} t{4,3} t{3,3}
Faces	triangle {3} square {4} hexagon {6} octagon {8}
Vertex figure	mirrored sphenoid
Coxeter group	${\tilde{B}}_4$, [4,3^{1,1}]
Symmetry group	Fm3̅m (225)
Dual	half pyramidille Cell:
Properties	vertex-transitive

The runcicantic cubic honeycomb or runcicantic cubic cellulation is a uniform space-filling tessellation (or honeycomb) in Euclidean 3-space. It is composed of truncated cuboctahedra, truncated cubes and truncated tetrahedra in a ratio of 1:1:2, with a mirrored sphenoid vertex figure. It is related to the runcicantellated cubic honeycomb.

John Horton Conway calls this honeycomb a f-tCO-trille, and its dual half pyramidille.

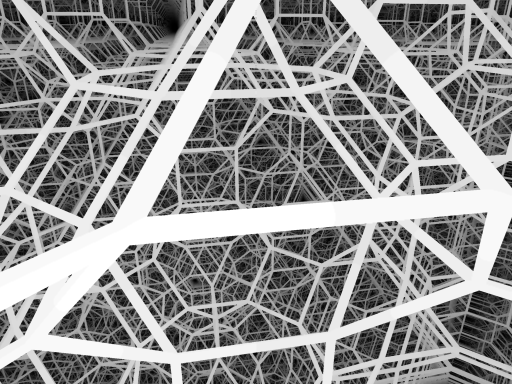
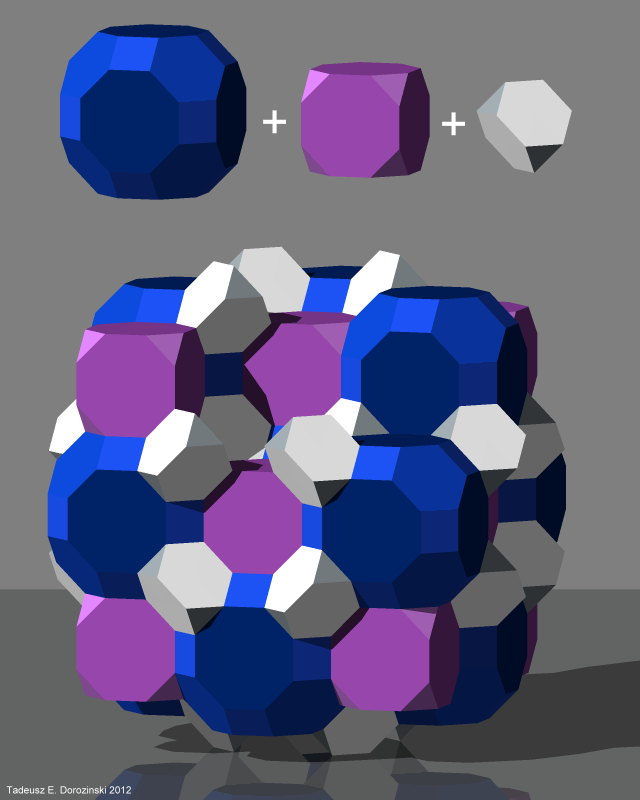

==== Half pyramidille ====
The dual to the runcitruncated cubic honeycomb is called a half pyramidille, with Coxeter diagram. Faces exist in 3 of 4 hyperplanes of the [4,3^{1,1}], ${\tilde{B}}_3$ Coxeter group.

Cells are irregular pyramids and can be seen as 1/12 of a cube, or 1/24 of a rhombic dodecahedron, each defined with three corner and the cube center.

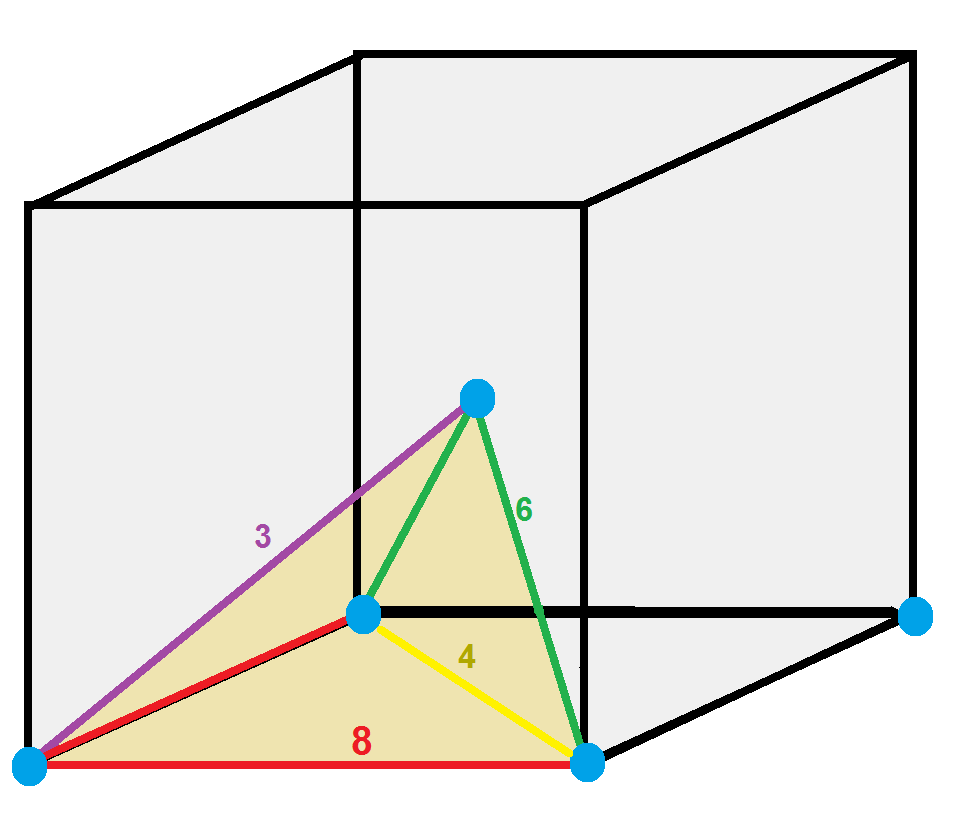

==== Related skew apeirohedra ====
A related uniform skew apeirohedron exists with the same vertex arrangement, but triangles and square removed. It can be seen as truncated tetrahedra and truncated cubes augmented together.

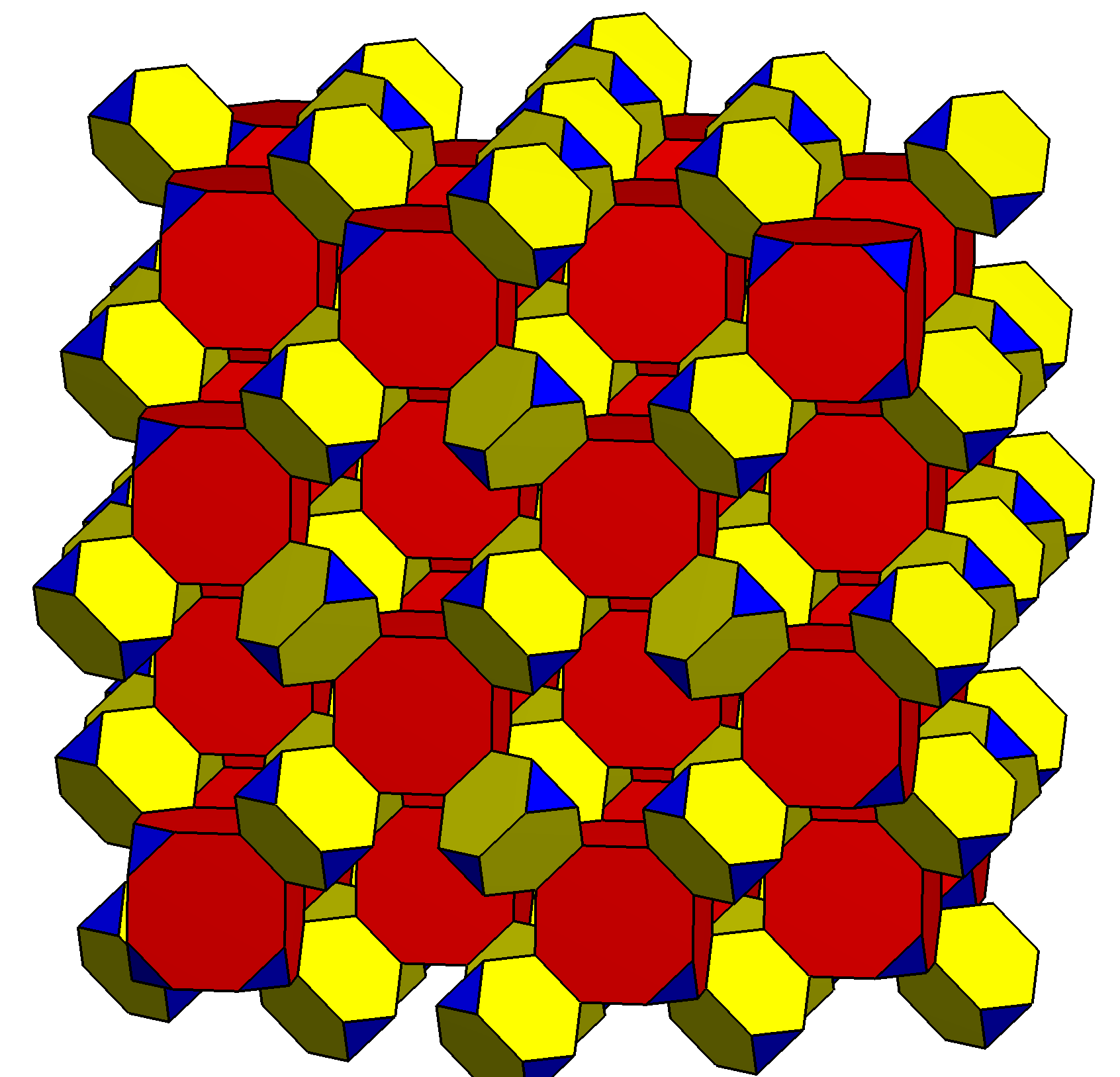

==== Related honeycombs ====
Runcicantic cubic	Runcicantellated cubic

=== Gyrated tetrahedral-octahedral honeycomb ===
Gyrated tetrahedral-octahedral honeycomb
Type	convex uniform honeycomb
Coxeter diagrams	
Schläfli symbols	h{4,3,4}:g h{6,3}h{∞} s{3,6}h{∞} s{3^{[3]}}h{∞}
Cells	{3,3} {3,4}
Faces	triangle {3}
Vertex figure	triangular orthobicupola G3.4.3.4
Space group	P6_{3}/mmc (194) [3,6,2^{+},∞]
Dual	trapezo-rhombic dodecahedral honeycomb
Properties	vertex-transitive

The gyrated tetrahedral-octahedral honeycomb or gyrated alternated cubic honeycomb is a space-filling tessellation (or honeycomb) in Euclidean 3-space made up of octahedra and tetrahedra in a ratio of 1:2.

It is vertex-uniform with 8 tetrahedra and 6 octahedra around each vertex.

It is not edge-uniform. All edges have 2 tetrahedra and 2 octahedra, but some are alternating, and some are paired.

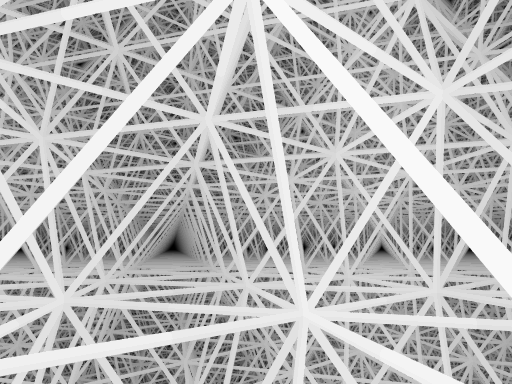
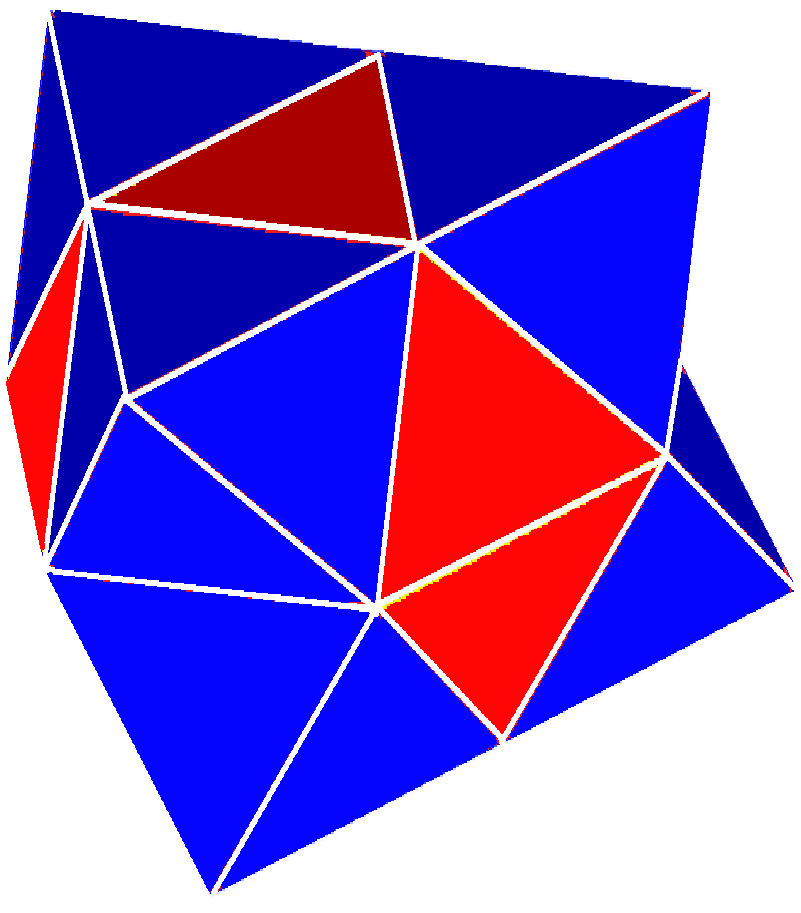

It can be seen as reflective layers of this layer honeycomb:

==== Construction by gyration ====
This is a less symmetric version of another honeycomb, tetrahedral-octahedral honeycomb, in which each edge is surrounded by alternating tetrahedra and octahedra. Both can be considered as consisting of layers one cell thick, within which the two kinds of cell strictly alternate. Because the faces on the planes separating these layers form a regular pattern of triangles, adjacent layers can be placed so that each octahedron in one layer meets a tetrahedron in the next layer, or so that each cell meets a cell of its own kind (the layer boundary thus becomes a reflection plane). The latter form is called gyrated.

The vertex figure is called a triangular orthobicupola, compared to the tetrahedral-octahedral honeycomb whose vertex figure cuboctahedron in a lower symmetry is called a triangular gyrobicupola, so the gyro- prefix is reversed in usage.

Vertex figures
Honeycomb	Gyrated tet-oct	Reflective tet-oct
Image		
Name	triangular orthobicupola	triangular gyrobicupola
Vertex figure		
Symmetry	D_{3h}, order 12	D_{3d}, order 12 (O_{h}, order 48)

==== Construction by alternation ====
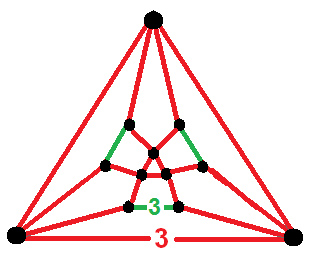
Vertex figure with nonplanar 3.3.3.3 vertex configuration for the triangular bipyramids

The geometry can also be constructed with an alternation operation applied to a hexagonal prismatic honeycomb. The hexagonal prism cells become octahedra and the voids create triangular bipyramids which can be divided into pairs of tetrahedra of this honeycomb. This honeycomb with bipyramids is called a ditetrahedral-octahedral honeycomb. There are 3 Coxeter-Dynkin diagrams, which can be seen as 1, 2, or 3 colors of octahedra:

=== Gyroelongated alternated cubic honeycomb ===
Gyroelongated alternated cubic honeycomb
Type	Uniform honeycomb
Schläfli symbol	h{4,3,4}:ge {3,6}h_{1}{∞}
Coxeter diagram	
Cells	{3,3} {3,4} (3.4.4)
Faces	triangle {3} square {4}
Vertex figure	
Space group	P6_{3}/mmc (194) [3,6,2^{+},∞]
Properties	vertex-transitive

The gyroelongated alternated cubic honeycomb or elongated triangular antiprismatic cellulation is a space-filling tessellation (or honeycomb) in Euclidean 3-space. It is composed of octahedra, triangular prisms, and tetrahedra in a ratio of 1:2:2.

It is vertex-transitive with 3 octahedra, 4 tetrahedra, 6 triangular prisms around each vertex.

It is one of 28 convex uniform honeycombs.

The elongated alternated cubic honeycomb has the same arrangement of cells at each vertex, but the overall arrangement differs. In the elongated form, each prism meets a tetrahedron at one of its triangular faces and an octahedron at the other; in the gyroelongated form, the prism meets the same kind of deltahedron at each end.

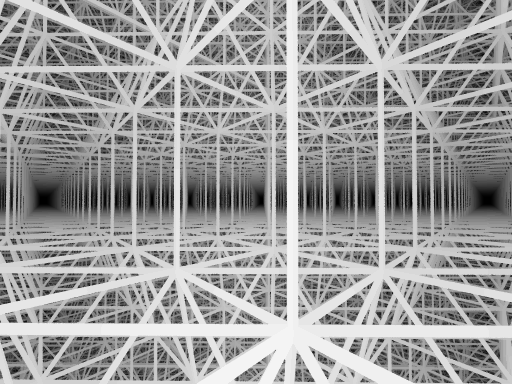
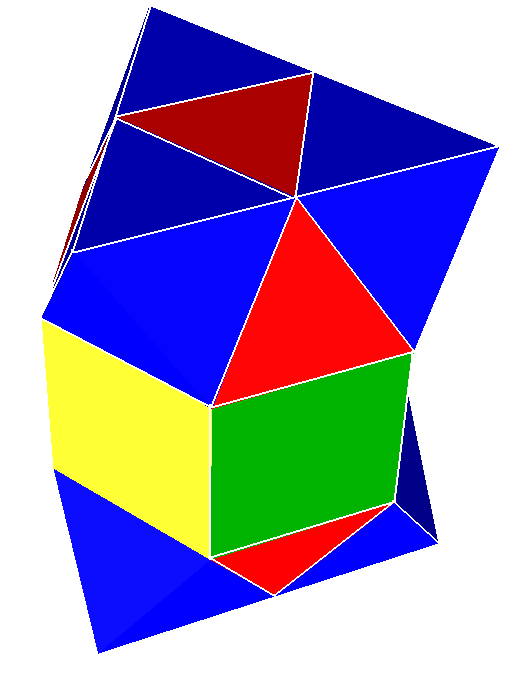

=== Elongated alternated cubic honeycomb ===
Elongated alternated cubic honeycomb
Type	Uniform honeycomb
Schläfli symbol	h{4,3,4}:e {3,6}g_{1}{∞}
Cells	{3,3} {3,4} (3.4.4)
Faces	triangle {3} square {4}
Vertex figure	triangular cupola joined to isosceles hexagonal pyramid
Symmetry group	[6,(3,2^{+},∞,2^{+})] ?
Properties	vertex-transitive

The elongated alternated cubic honeycomb or elongated triangular gyroprismatic cellulation is a space-filling tessellation (or honeycomb) in Euclidean 3-space. It is composed of octahedra, triangular prisms, and tetrahedra in a ratio of 1:2:2.

It is vertex-transitive with 3 octahedra, 4 tetrahedra, 6 triangular prisms around each vertex. Each prism meets an octahedron at one end and a tetrahedron at the other.

It is one of 28 convex uniform honeycombs.

It has a gyrated form called the gyroelongated alternated cubic honeycomb with the same arrangement of cells at each vertex.

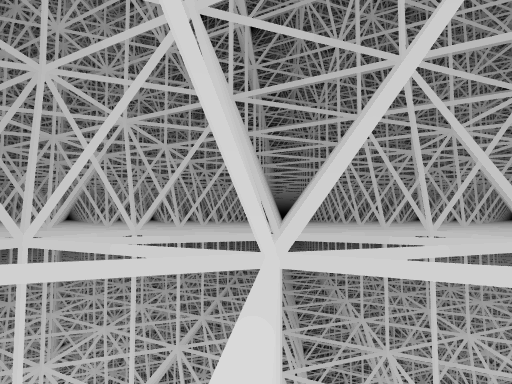
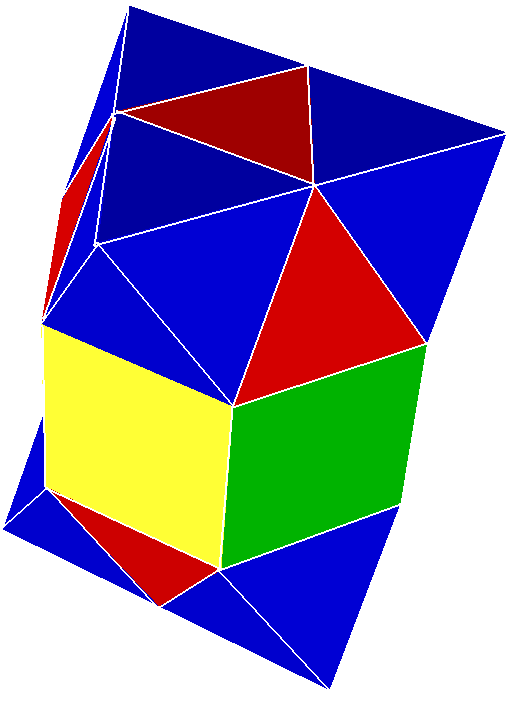

== See also ==
- Architectonic and catoptric tessellation
- Cubic honeycomb
- Space frame
- Tetragonal disphenoid honeycomb
- 16-cell honeycomb
- 24-cell honeycomb

== Notes ==
Fundamental convex regular and uniform honeycombs in dimensions 2–9
Space	Family	${\tilde{A}}_{n-1}$	${\tilde{C}}_{n-1}$	${\tilde{B}}_{n-1}$	${\tilde{D}}_{n-1}$	${\tilde{G}}_2$ / ${\tilde{F}}_4$ / ${\tilde{E}}_{n-1}$
E^{2}	Uniform tiling	0_{[3]}	δ_{3}	hδ_{3}	qδ_{3}	Hexagonal
E^{3}	Uniform convex honeycomb	0_{[4]}	δ_{4}	hδ_{4}	qδ_{4}	
E^{4}	Uniform 4-honeycomb	0_{[5]}	δ_{5}	hδ_{5}	qδ_{5}	24-cell honeycomb
E^{5}	Uniform 5-honeycomb	0_{[6]}	δ_{6}	hδ_{6}	qδ_{6}	
E^{6}	Uniform 6-honeycomb	0_{[7]}	δ_{7}	hδ_{7}	qδ_{7}	2_{22}
E^{7}	Uniform 7-honeycomb	0_{[8]}	δ_{8}	hδ_{8}	qδ_{8}	1_{33} • 3_{31}
E^{8}	Uniform 8-honeycomb	0_{[9]}	δ_{9}	hδ_{9}	qδ_{9}	1_{52} • 2_{51} • 5_{21}
E^{9}	Uniform 9-honeycomb	0_{[10]}	δ_{10}	hδ_{10}	qδ_{10}	
E^{10}	Uniform 10-honeycomb	0_{[11]}	δ_{11}	hδ_{11}	qδ_{11}	
E^{n−1}	Uniform (n−1)-honeycomb	0_{[n]}	δ_{n}	hδ_{n}	qδ_{n}	1_{k2} • 2_{k1} • k_{21}
