= Honeycomb (geometry) =

Tiling of euclidean or hyperbolic space of three or more dimensions

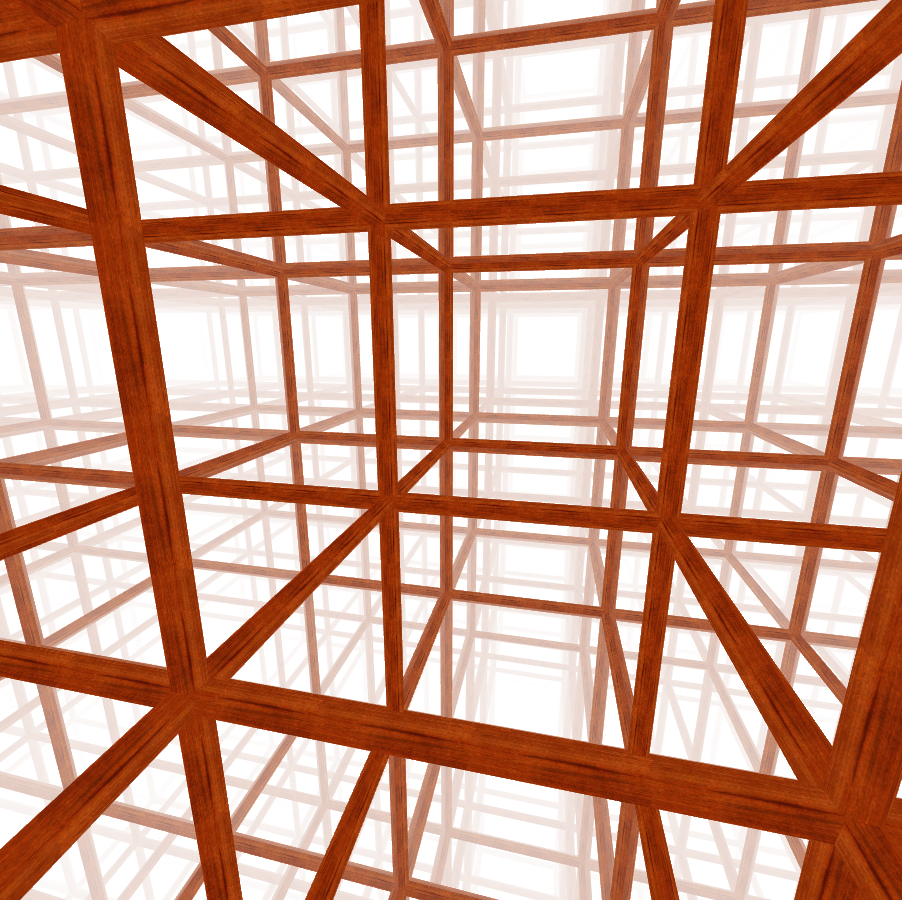
Cubic honeycomb

In geometry, a honeycomb is a space filling or close packing of polyhedral or higher-dimensional cells, so that there are no gaps. It is an example of the more general mathematical tiling or tessellation in any number of dimensions. Its dimension can be clarified as n-honeycomb for a honeycomb of n-dimensional space.

Honeycombs are usually constructed in ordinary Euclidean ("flat") space. They may also be constructed in non-Euclidean spaces, such as hyperbolic honeycombs. Any finite uniform polytope can be projected to its circumsphere to form a uniform honeycomb in spherical space.

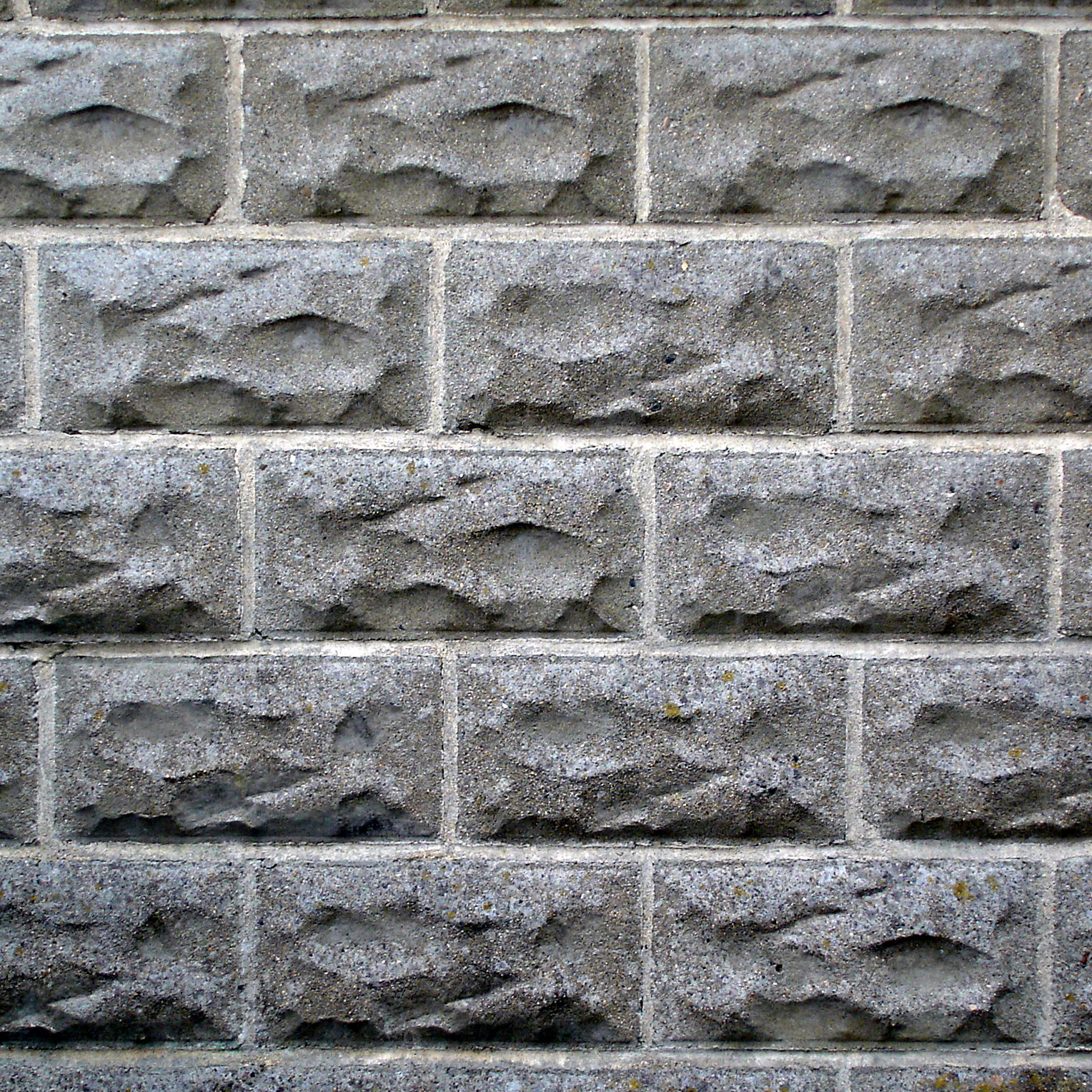
It is possible to fill the plane with polygons which do not meet at their corners, for example using rectangles, as in a brick wall pattern: this is not a proper tiling because corners lie part way along the edge of a neighbouring polygon. Similarly, in a proper honeycomb, there must be no edges or vertices lying part way along the face of a neighbouring cell. Interpreting each brick face as a hexagon having two interior angles of 180 degrees allows the pattern to be considered as a proper tiling. However, not all geometers accept such hexagons.

== Classification ==
There are infinitely many honeycombs, which have only been partially classified. The more regular ones have attracted the most interest, while a rich and varied assortment of others continue to be discovered.

The simplest honeycombs to build are formed from stacked layers or slabs of prisms based on some tessellations of the plane. In particular, for every parallelepiped, copies can fill space, with the cubic honeycomb being special because it is the only regular honeycomb in ordinary (Euclidean) space. Another family is the Hill tetrahedra and their generalizations, which can also tile the space.

=== Uniform 3-honeycombs ===
A 3-dimensional uniform honeycomb is a honeycomb in 3-space composed of uniform polyhedral cells, and having all vertices the same (i.e., the group of [isometries of 3-space that preserve the tiling] is transitive on vertices). There are 28 convex examples in Euclidean 3-space, also called the Archimedean honeycombs.

A honeycomb is called regular if the group of isometries preserving the tiling acts transitively on flags, where a flag is a vertex lying on an edge lying on a face lying on a cell. Every regular honeycomb is automatically uniform. However, there is just one regular honeycomb in Euclidean 3-space, the cubic honeycomb. Two are quasiregular (made from two types of regular cells):

Type	Regular cubic honeycomb	Quasiregular honeycombs
Cells	Cubic	Octahedra and tetrahedra
Slab layer		

The tetrahedral-octahedral honeycomb and gyrated tetrahedral-octahedral honeycombs are generated by 3 or 2 positions of slab layer of cells, each alternating tetrahedra and octahedra. An infinite number of unique honeycombs can be created by higher order of patterns of repeating these slab layers.

=== Space-filling polyhedra ===
A honeycomb having all cells identical within its symmetries is said to be cell-transitive or isochoric. In the 3-dimensional euclidean space, a cell of such a honeycomb is said to be a space-filling polyhedron. A necessary condition for a polyhedron to be a space-filling polyhedron is that its Dehn invariant must be zero, ruling out any of the Platonic solids other than the cube.

Five space-filling convex polyhedra can tessellate 3-dimensional euclidean space using translations only. They are called parallelohedra:

1. Cubic honeycomb (or variations: cuboid, rhombic hexahedron or parallelepiped)
2. Hexagonal prismatic honeycomb
3. Rhombic dodecahedral honeycomb
4. Elongated dodecahedral honeycomb
5. Bitruncated cubic honeycomb or truncated octahedra

Name	Cube (parallelepiped)	Hexagonal prism Elongated cube	Rhombic dodecahedron	Elongated dodecahedron	Truncated octahedron
Images (colors indicate parallel edges)					
Number of generators	3	4	4	5	6
Vertices	8	12	14	18	24
Edges	12	18	24	28	36
Faces	6	8	12	12	14
Tiling Image					
Tiling Image, Alternate					
Tiling name	Cubic	Hexagonal prismatic	Rhombic dodecahedral	Elongated dodecahedral	Bitruncated cubic

Other known examples of space-filling polyhedra include:

- The triangular prismatic honeycomb
- The gyrated triangular prismatic honeycomb
- The triakis truncated tetrahedral honeycomb. The Voronoi cells of the carbon atoms in diamond are this shape.
- The trapezo-rhombic dodecahedral honeycomb
- Isohedral tilings

=== Other honeycombs with two or more polyhedra ===
Sometimes, two or more different polyhedra, not necessarily having different nets, may be combined to fill space. Besides many of the uniform honeycombs, another well known example is the Weaire–Phelan structure, adopted from the structure of clathrate hydrate crystals.

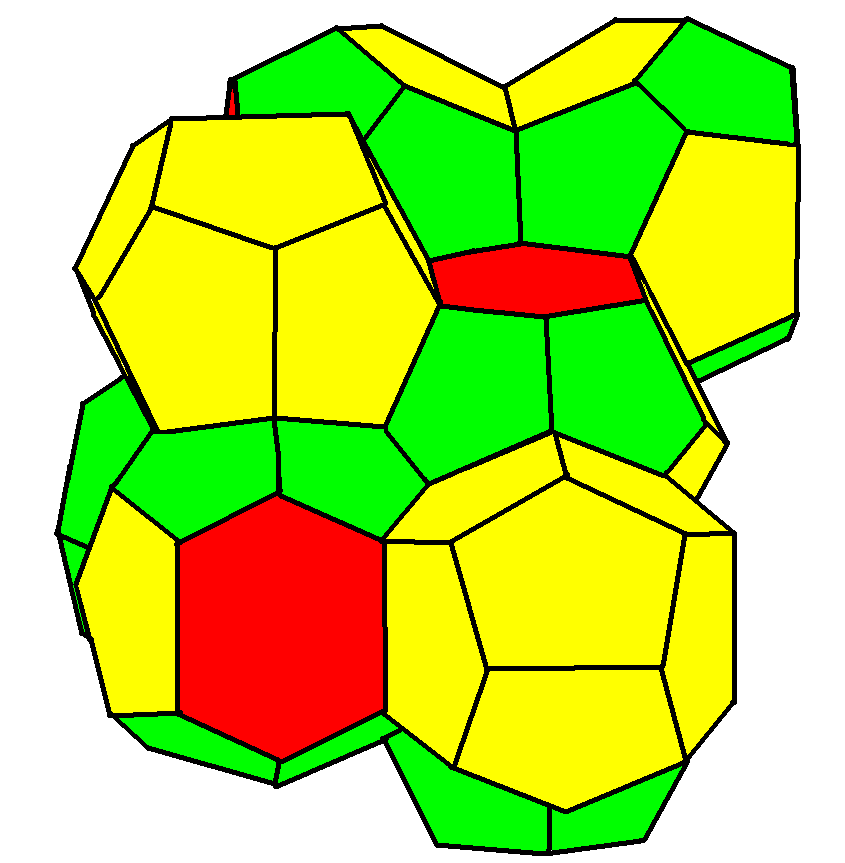
The periodic unit of the Weaire–Phelan structure.

A honeycomb by left and right-handed versions of a triskaidecahedron.

=== Non-convex 3-honeycombs ===
Documented examples are rare. Two classes can be distinguished:

- Non-convex cells which pack without overlapping, analogous to tilings of concave polygons. These include a packing of the small stellated rhombic dodecahedron, as in the Yoshimoto Cube.
- Overlapping of cells whose positive and negative densities 'cancel out' to form a uniformly dense continuum, analogous to overlapping tilings of the plane.

=== Hyperbolic honeycombs ===
In 3-dimensional hyperbolic space, the dihedral angle of a polyhedron depends on its size. The regular hyperbolic honeycombs thus include two with four or five dodecahedra meeting at each edge; their dihedral angles thus are π/2 and 2π/5, both of which are less than that of a Euclidean dodecahedron. Apart from this effect, the hyperbolic honeycombs obey the same topological constraints as Euclidean honeycombs and polychora.

The 4 compact and 11 paracompact regular hyperbolic honeycombs and many compact and paracompact uniform hyperbolic honeycombs have been enumerated.

Four regular compact honeycombs in H^{3}
{5,3,4}	{4,3,5}	{3,5,3}	{5,3,5}

11 paracompact regular honeycombs
{6,3,3}	{6,3,4}	{6,3,5}	{6,3,6}	{4,4,3}	{4,4,4}
{3,3,6}	{4,3,6}	{5,3,6}	{3,6,3}	{3,4,4}	

== Duality of 3-honeycombs ==
For every honeycomb there is a dual honeycomb, which may be obtained by exchanging:

cells for vertices.
faces for edges.

These are just the rules for dualising four-dimensional 4-polytopes, except that the usual finite method of reciprocation about a concentric hypersphere can run into problems.

The more regular honeycombs dualise neatly:

- The cubic honeycomb is self-dual.
- That of octahedra and tetrahedra is dual to that of rhombic dodecahedra.
- The slab honeycombs derived from uniform plane tilings are dual to each other in the same way that the tilings are.
- The duals of the remaining Archimedean honeycombs are all cell-transitive and have been described by Inchbald.

== Self-dual honeycombs ==
Honeycombs can also be self-dual. All n-dimensional hypercubic honeycombs with Schläfli symbols {4,3^{n−2},4}, are self-dual.

== See also ==
- List of uniform tilings
- Regular honeycombs
- Infinite skew polyhedron
- Plesiohedron

Fundamental convex regular and uniform honeycombs in dimensions 2–9
Space	Family	${\tilde{A}}_{n-1}$	${\tilde{C}}_{n-1}$	${\tilde{B}}_{n-1}$	${\tilde{D}}_{n-1}$	${\tilde{G}}_2$ / ${\tilde{F}}_4$ / ${\tilde{E}}_{n-1}$
E^{2}	Uniform tiling	0_{[3]}	δ_{3}	hδ_{3}	qδ_{3}	Hexagonal
E^{3}	Uniform convex honeycomb	0_{[4]}	δ_{4}	hδ_{4}	qδ_{4}	
E^{4}	Uniform 4-honeycomb	0_{[5]}	δ_{5}	hδ_{5}	qδ_{5}	24-cell honeycomb
E^{5}	Uniform 5-honeycomb	0_{[6]}	δ_{6}	hδ_{6}	qδ_{6}	
E^{6}	Uniform 6-honeycomb	0_{[7]}	δ_{7}	hδ_{7}	qδ_{7}	2_{22}
E^{7}	Uniform 7-honeycomb	0_{[8]}	δ_{8}	hδ_{8}	qδ_{8}	1_{33} • 3_{31}
E^{8}	Uniform 8-honeycomb	0_{[9]}	δ_{9}	hδ_{9}	qδ_{9}	1_{52} • 2_{51} • 5_{21}
E^{9}	Uniform 9-honeycomb	0_{[10]}	δ_{10}	hδ_{10}	qδ_{10}	
E^{10}	Uniform 10-honeycomb	0_{[11]}	δ_{11}	hδ_{11}	qδ_{11}	
E^{n−1}	Uniform (n−1)-honeycomb	0_{[n]}	δ_{n}	hδ_{n}	qδ_{n}	1_{k2} • 2_{k1} • k_{21}
