= Heronian tetrahedron =

Tetrahedron whose edge lengths, face areas and volume are all integers

A Heronian tetrahedron (also called a Heron tetrahedron or perfect pyramid) is a tetrahedron whose edge lengths, face areas and volume are all integers. The faces must therefore all be Heronian triangles (named for Hero of Alexandria). Every Heronian tetrahedron can be arranged in Euclidean space so that its vertex coordinates are also integers.

== Examples ==
Isometric projection of Euler's Heronian birectangular tetrahedron in its minimum bounding box

An example known to Leonhard Euler is a Heronian birectangular tetrahedron, a tetrahedron with a path of three edges parallel to the three coordinate axes and with all faces being right triangles. The lengths of the edges on the path of axis-parallel edges are 153, 104, and 672, and the other three edge lengths are 185, 680, and 697, forming four right triangle faces described by the Pythagorean triples (153,104,185), (104,672,680), (153,680,697), and (185,672,697).

Eight examples of Heronian tetrahedra were discovered in 1877 by Reinhold Hoppe.

117 is the smallest possible length of the longest edge of a perfect tetrahedron with integral edge lengths. Its other edge lengths are 51, 52, 53, 80 and 84. 8064 is the smallest possible volume (and 6384 is the smallest possible surface area) of a perfect tetrahedron. The integral edge lengths of a Heronian tetrahedron with this volume and surface area are 25, 39, 56, 120, 153 and 160.

In 1943, E. P. Starke published another example, in which two faces are isosceles triangles with base 896 and sides 1073, and the other two faces are also isosceles with base 990 and the same sides. However, Starke made an error in reporting its volume which has become widely copied. The correct volume is 124185600, twice the number reported by Starke.

Sascha Kurz has used computer search algorithms to find all Heronian tetrahedra with longest edge length at most 600000.

== Classification, infinite families, and special types of tetrahedron ==
A regular tetrahedron (one with all faces being equilateral) cannot be a Heronian tetrahedron because, for regular tetrahedra whose edge lengths are integers, the face areas and volume are irrational numbers. For the same reason no Heronian tetrahedron can have an equilateral triangle as one of its faces.

There are infinitely many Heronian tetrahedra, and more strongly infinitely many Heronian disphenoids, tetrahedra in which all faces are congruent and each pair of opposite sides has equal lengths. In this case, there are only three edge lengths needed to describe the tetrahedron, rather than six, and the triples of lengths that define Heronian tetrahedra can be characterized using an elliptic curve. There are also infinitely many Heronian tetrahedra with a cycle of four equal edge lengths, in which all faces are isosceles triangles.

There are also infinitely many Heronian birectangular tetrahedra. One method for generating tetrahedra of this type derives the axis-parallel edge lengths $a$, $b$, and $c$ from two equal sums of fourth powers

$$p^4+s^4=q^4+r^4$$

using the formulas

$$a=\bigl|(pq)^2-(rs)^2\bigr|,$$
$$b=\bigl|2pqrs\bigr|,$$
$$c=\bigl|(pr)^2-(qs)^2\bigr|.$$

For instance, the tetrahedron derived in this way from an identity of Leonhard Euler, $59^4+158^4=133^4+134^4$, has $a$, $b$, and $c$ equal to 386678175, 332273368, and 379083360, with the hypotenuse of right triangle $ab$ equal to 509828993, the hypotenuse of right triangle $bc$ equal to 504093032, and the hypotenuse of the remaining two sides equal to 635318657. For these tetrahedra, $a$, $b$, and $c$ form the edge lengths of an almost-perfect cuboid, a rectangular cuboid in which the sides, two of the three face diagonals, and the body diagonal are all integers.

A complete classification of all Heronian tetrahedra remains unknown.

== Heronian trirectangular tetrahedron ==
No example of a Heronian trirectangular tetrahedron had been found and no one has proven that none exist.

The existence of a solution to the Heronian trirectangular tetrahedron problem is equivalent to the existence of a solution to the Perfect cuboid problem, and conversely, the existence of a Perfect cuboid implies the existence of a Heronian trirectangular tetrahedron. If there exists a Heronian trirectangular tetrahedron with three orthogonal edges $a, b, c$, then the cuboid with edges $(ab, ac, bc)$ has integer face diagonals and an integer space diagonal, making it a Perfect cuboid. And vice versa, if there exists a Perfect сuboid with edges $a, b, c$, then the tetrahedron with orthogonal integer edges $(ab, ac, bc)$ at a common vertex is Heronian.

== Related shapes ==
An alternative definition of Heronian triangles is that they can be formed by gluing together two integer right triangles along a common side. This definition has also been generalized to three dimensions, leading to a different class of tetrahedra that have also been called Heron tetrahedra.
