= Orthocentric tetrahedron =

Tetrahedron where all pairs of opposite edges are perpendicular

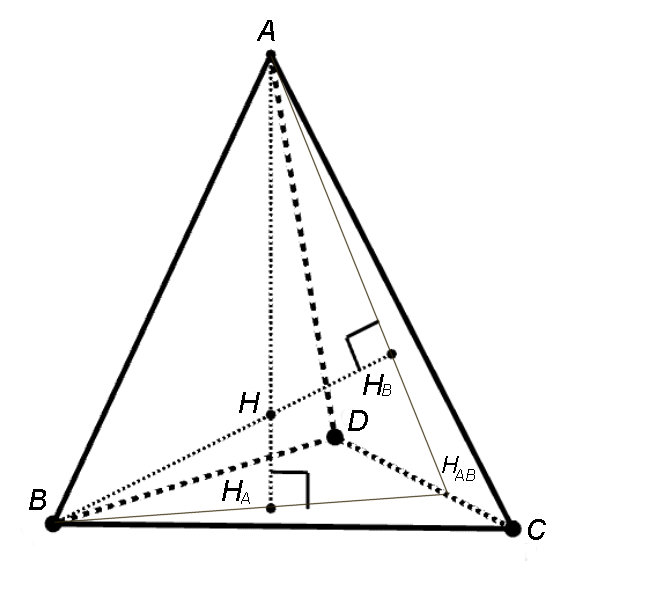
The four altitudes of an orthogonal tetrahedron meet at its orthocenter. Edges AB, BC, CA are perpendicular to, respectively, edges CD, AD, BD.

In geometry, an orthocentric tetrahedron is a tetrahedron where all three pairs of opposite edges are perpendicular. It can also be known as the perpendicular tetrahedron. It is also known as an orthogonal tetrahedron since orthogonal means perpendicular. It was first studied by Simon Lhuilier in 1782, and got the name orthocentric tetrahedron by G. de Longchamps in 1890.

In an orthocentric tetrahedron the four altitudes are concurrent. This common point is called the tetrahedron orthocenter (a generalization of the orthocenter of a triangle). It has the property that it is the symmetric point of the center of the circumscribed sphere with respect to the centroid. Hence the orthocenter coincides with the Monge point of the tetrahedron.

== Characterizations ==
All tetrahedra can be inscribed in a parallelepiped. A tetrahedron is orthocentric if and only if its circumscribed parallelepiped is a rhombohedron. Indeed, in any tetrahedron, a pair of opposite edges is perpendicular if and only if the corresponding faces of the circumscribed parallelepiped are rhombi. If four faces of a parallelepiped are rhombi, then all edges have equal lengths and all six faces are rhombi; it follows that if two pairs of opposite edges in a tetrahedron are perpendicular, then so is the third pair, and the tetrahedron is orthocentric.

A tetrahedron ABCD is orthocentric if and only if the sum of the squares of opposite edges is the same for the three pairs of opposite edges:

$$\overline{AB}^2 + \overline{CD}^2 = \overline{AC}^2 + \overline{BD}^2 = \overline{AD}^2 + \overline{BC}^2.$$

Another necessary and sufficient condition for a tetrahedron to be orthocentric is that its three bimedians have equal length.

== Volume ==
The characterization regarding the edges implies that if only four of the six edges of an orthocentric tetrahedron are known, the remaining two can be calculated as long as they are not opposite to each other. Therefore the volume of an orthocentric tetrahedron can be expressed in terms of four edges a, b, c, d. The formula is

$$V=\frac{1}{6}\sqrt{4(c^2+d^2)s(s-a)(s-b)(s-c)-a^2b^2c^2}$$

where c and d are opposite edges, and $s=\tfrac{1}{2}(a+b+c)$.

== See also ==
- Disphenoid
- Trirectangular tetrahedron
