= Hill tetrahedron =

Space-filling tetrahedron

In geometry, the Hill tetrahedra are a family of space-filling tetrahedra. They were discovered in 1896 by M. J. M. Hill, a professor of mathematics at the University College London, who showed that they are scissor-congruent to a cube.

== Construction ==
For every $\alpha \in (0,2\pi/3)$, let $v_1,v_2,v_3 \in \mathbb R^3$ be three unit vectors with angle $\alpha$ between every two of them. Define the Hill tetrahedron $Q(\alpha)$ as follows:
$$Q(\alpha) \, = \, \{c_1 v_1+c_2 v_2+c_3 v_3 \mid 0 \le c_1 \le c_2 \le c_3 \le 1\}.$$

A special case $Q=Q(\pi/2)$ is the tetrahedron having all sides right triangles, two with sides $(1,1,\sqrt{2})$ and two with sides $(1,\sqrt{2},\sqrt{3})$. Ludwig Schläfli studied $Q$ as a special case of the orthoscheme, and H. S. M. Coxeter called it the characteristic tetrahedron of the cubic spacefilling.

== Properties ==
- A cube can be tiled with six copies of $Q$.
- Every $Q(\alpha)$ can be dissected into three polytopes which can be reassembled into a prism.

== Generalizations ==
In 1951, Hugo Hadwiger found the following $n$-dimensional generalization of Hill tetrahedra:
$$Q(w) = \{c_1 v_1+\cdots +c_n v_n \mid  0 \le c_1 \le \cdots \le c_n \le 1\},$$
where vectors $v_1,\ldots,v_n$ satisfy $(v_i,v_j) = w$ for all $1\le i< j\le n$, and where $-1/(n-1)< w < 1$. Hadwiger showed that all such simplices are scissor congruent to a hypercube.
