= Goursat tetrahedron =

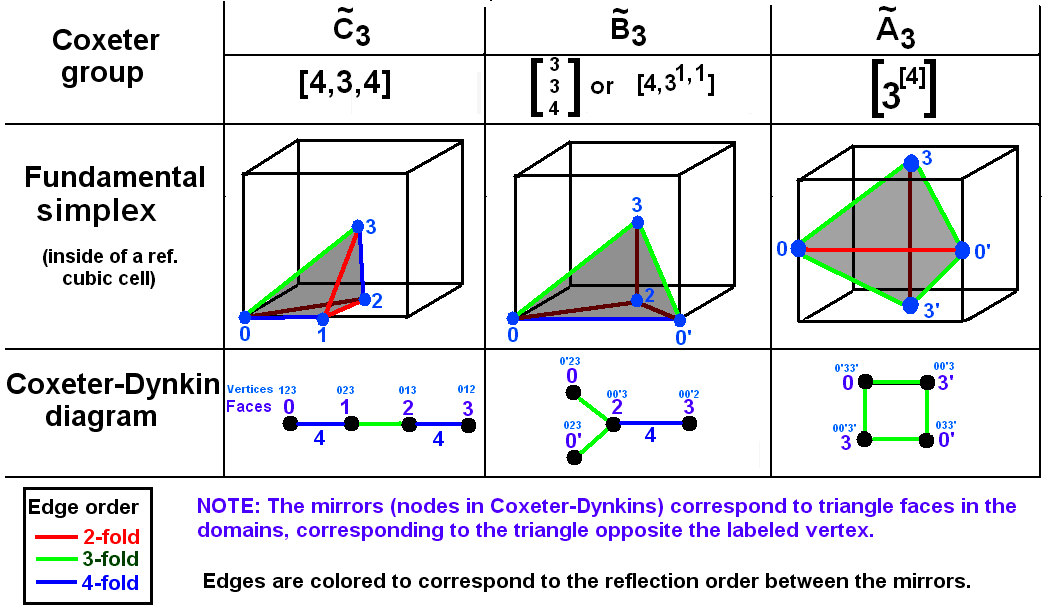
For Euclidean 3-space, there are 3 simple and related Goursat tetrahedra, represented by [4,3,4], [4,3^{1,1}], and [3^{[4]}]. They can be seen inside as points on and within a cube, {4,3}.

In geometry, a Goursat tetrahedron is a tetrahedral fundamental domain of a Wythoff construction. Each tetrahedral face represents a reflection hyperplane on 3-dimensional surfaces: the 3-sphere, Euclidean 3-space, and hyperbolic 3-space. Coxeter named them after Édouard Goursat who first looked into these domains. It is an extension of the theory of Schwarz triangles for Wythoff constructions on the sphere.

== Graphical representation ==
A Goursat tetrahedron can be represented graphically by a tetrahedral graph, which is in a dual configuration of the fundamental domain tetrahedron. In the graph, each node represents a face (mirror) of the Goursat tetrahedron. Each edge is labeled by a rational value corresponding to the reflection order, being π/dihedral angle.

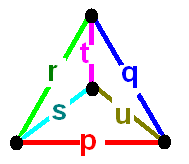

A 4-node Coxeter-Dynkin diagram represents this tetrahedral graph with order-2 edges hidden. If many edges are order 2, the Coxeter group can be represented by a bracket notation.

Existence requires each of the 3-node subgraphs of this graph, (p q r), (p u s), (q t u), and (r s t), must correspond to a Schwarz triangle.

== Extended symmetry ==
The symmetry of a Goursat tetrahedron can be tetrahedral symmetry of any subgroup symmetry shown in this tree, with subgroups below with subgroup indices labeled in the colored edges.

An extended symmetry of the Goursat tetrahedron is a semidirect product of the Coxeter group symmetry and the fundamental domain symmetry (the Goursat tetrahedron in these cases). Coxeter notation supports this symmetry as double-brackets like [Y[X]] means full Coxeter group symmetry [X], with Y as a symmetry of the Goursat tetrahedron. If Y is a pure reflective symmetry, the group will represent another Coxeter group of mirrors. If there is only one simple doubling symmetry, Y can be implicit like [[X]] with either reflectional or rotational symmetry depending on the context.

The extended symmetry of each Goursat tetrahedron is also given below. The highest possible symmetry is that of the regular tetrahedron as [3,3], and this occurs in the prismatic point group [2,2,2] or [2^{[3,3]}] and the paracompact hyperbolic group [3^{[3,3]}].

See Tetrahedron#Isometries of irregular tetrahedra for 7 lower symmetry isometries of the tetrahedron.

== Whole number solutions ==
The following sections show all of the whole number Goursat tetrahedral solutions on the 3-sphere, Euclidean 3-space, and hyperbolic 3-space. The extended symmetry of each tetrahedron is also given.

The colored tetrahedal diagrams below are vertex figures for omnitruncated polytopes and honeycombs from each symmetry family. The edge labels represent polygonal face orders, which is double the Coxeter graph branch order. The dihedral angle of an edge labeled 2n is π/n. Yellow edges labeled 4 come from right angle (unconnected) mirror nodes in the Coxeter diagram.

=== 3-sphere (finite) solutions ===
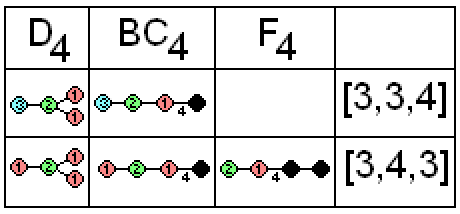
Finite Coxeter groups isomorphisms

The solutions for the 3-sphere with density 1 solutions are: (Uniform polychora)

Duoprisms and hyperprisms:
Coxeter group and diagram	[2,2,2]	[p,2,2]	[p,2,q]	[p,2,p]	[3,3,2]	[4,3,2]	[5,3,2]
Group symmetry order	16	8p	4pq	4p^{2}	48	96	240
Tetrahedron symmetry	[3,3] (order 24)	[2] (order 4)	[2] (order 4)	[2^{+},4] (order 8)	[ ] (order 2)	[ ]^{+} (order 1)	[ ]^{+} (order 1)
Extended symmetry	[(3,3)[2,2,2]] =[4,3,3]	[2[p,2,2]] =[2p,2,4]	[2[p,2,q]] =[2p,2,2q]	[(2^{+},4)[p,2,p]] =[2^{+}[2p,2,2p]]	[1[3,3,2]] =[4,3,2]	[4,3,2]	[5,3,2]
Extended symmetry order	384	32p	16pq	32p^{2}	96	96	240

Graph type	Linear				Tridental
Coxeter group and diagram	Pentachoric [3,3,3]	Hexadecachoric [4,3,3]	Icositetrachoric [3,4,3]	Hexacosichoric [5,3,3]	Demitesseractic [3^{1,1,1}]
Vertex figure of omnitruncated uniform polychora
Tetrahedron					
Group symmetry order	120	384	1152	14400	192
Tetrahedron symmetry	[2]^{+} (order 2)	[ ]^{+} (order 1)	[2]^{+} (order 2)	[ ]^{+} (order 1)	[3] (order 6)
Extended symmetry	[2^{+}[3,3,3]]	[4,3,3]	[2^{+}[3,4,3]]	[5,3,3]	[3[3^{1,1,1}]] =[3,4,3]
Extended symmetry order	240	384	2304	14400	1152

=== Euclidean (affine) 3-space solutions ===
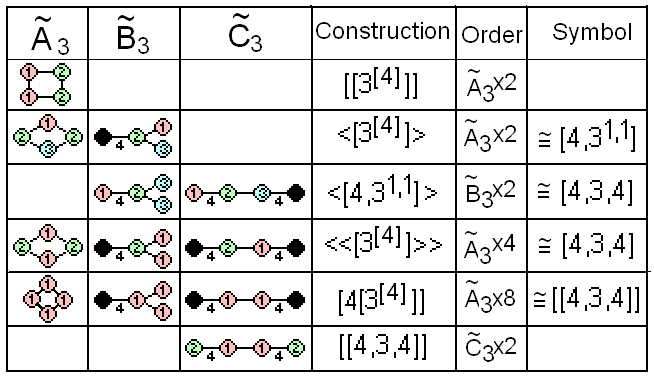
Euclidean Coxeter group isomorphisms

Density 1 solutions: Convex uniform honeycombs:

Graph type	Linear Orthoscheme	Tri-dental Plagioscheme	Loop Cycloscheme	Prismatic			Degenerate
Coxeter group Coxeter diagram	[4,3,4]	[4,3^{1,1}]	[3^{[4]}]	[4,4,2]	[6,3,2]	[3^{[3]},2]	[∞,2,∞]
Vertex figure of omnitruncated honeycombs
Tetrahedron							
Tetrahedron Symmetry	[2]^{+} (order 2)	[ ] (order 2)	[2^{+},4] (order 8)	[ ] (order 2)	[ ]^{+} (order 1)	[3] (order 6)	[2^{+},4] (order 8)
Extended symmetry	[(2^{+})[4,3,4]]	[1[4,3^{1,1}]] =[4,3,4]	[(2^{+},4)[3^{[4]}]] =[2^{+}[4,3,4]]	[1[4,4,2]] =[4,4,2]	[6,3,2]	[3[3^{[3]},2]] =[3,6,2]	[(2^{+},4)[∞,2,∞]] =[1[4,4]]

=== Compact hyperbolic 3-space solutions ===
Density 1 solutions: (Convex uniform honeycombs in hyperbolic space) (Coxeter diagram#Compact (Lannér simplex groups))

Rank 4 Lannér simplex groups
Graph type	Linear			Tri-dental	
Coxeter group Coxeter diagram	[3,5,3]	[5,3,4]	[5,3,5]	[5,3^{1,1}]	
Vertex figures of omnitruncated honeycombs
Tetrahedron					
Tetrahedron Symmetry	[2]^{+} (order 2)	[ ]^{+} (order 1)	[2]^{+} (order 2)	[ ] (order 2)	
Extended symmetry	[2^{+}[3,5,3]]	[5,3,4]	[2^{+}[5,3,5]]	[1[5,3^{1,1}]] =[5,3,4]	
Graph type	Loop				
Coxeter group Coxeter diagram	[(4,3,3,3)]	[(4,3)^{2}]	[(5,3,3,3)]	[(5,3,4,3)]	[(5,3)^{2}]
Vertex figures of omnitruncated honeycombs
Tetrahedron					
Tetrahedron Symmetry	[2]^{+} (order 2)	[2,2]^{+} (order 4)	[2]^{+} (order 2)	[2]^{+} (order 2)	[2,2]^{+} (order 4)
Extended symmetry	[2^{+}[(4,3,3,3)]]	[(2,2)^{+}[(4,3)^{2}]]	[2^{+}[(5,3,3,3)]]	[2^{+}[(5,3,4,3)]]	[(2,2)^{+}[(5,3)^{2}]]

=== Paracompact hyperbolic 3-space solutions ===
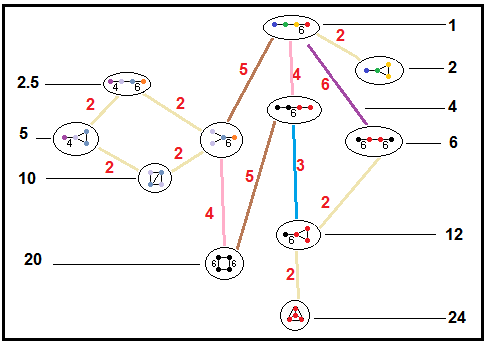
This show subgroup relations of paracompact hyperbolic Goursat tetrahedra. Order 2 subgroups represent bisecting a Goursat tetrahedron with a plane of mirror symmetry

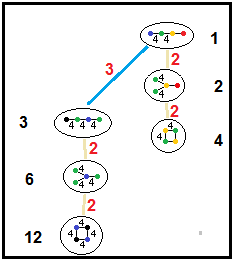

Density 1 solutions: (See Coxeter diagram#Paracompact (Koszul simplex groups))

Rank 4 Koszul simplex groups
Graph type	Linear graphs							
Coxeter group and diagram	[6,3,3]	[3,6,3]	[6,3,4]	[6,3,5]	[6,3,6]	[4,4,3]	[4,4,4]	
Tetrahedron symmetry	[ ]^{+} (order 1)	[2]^{+} (order 2)	[ ]^{+} (order 1)	[ ]^{+} (order 1)	[2]^{+} (order 2)	[ ]^{+} (order 1)	[2]^{+} (order 2)	
Extended symmetry	[6,3,3]	[2^{+}[3,6,3]]	[6,3,4]	[6,3,5]	[2^{+}[6,3,6]]	[4,4,3]	[2^{+}[4,4,4]]	
Graph type	Loop graphs							
Coxeter group and diagram	[3^{[ ]×[ ]}]	[(4,4,3,3)]	[(4^{3},3)]	[4^{[4]}]	[(6,3^{3})]	[(6,3,4,3)]	[(6,3,5,3)]	[(6,3)^{[2]}]
Tetrahedron symmetry	[2] (order 4)	[ ] (order 2)	[2]^{+} (order 2)	[2^{+},4] (order 8)	[2]^{+} (order 2)	[2]^{+} (order 2)	[2]^{+} (order 2)	[2,2]^{+} (order 4)
Extended symmetry	[2[3^{[ ]×[ ]}]] =[6,3,4]	[1[(4,4,3,3)]] =[3,4^{1,1}]	[2^{+}[(4^{3},3)]]	[(2^{+},4)[4^{[4]}]] =[2^{+}[4,4,4]]	[2^{+}[(6,3^{3})]]	[2^{+}[(6,3,4,3)]]	[2^{+}[(6,3,5,3)]]	[(2,2)^{+}[(6,3)^{[2]}]]
Graph type	Tri-dental			Loop-n-tail				Simplex
Coxeter group and diagram	[6,3^{1,1}]	[3,4^{1,1}]	[4^{1,1,1}]	[3,3^{[3]}]	[4,3^{[3]}]	[5,3^{[3]}]	[6,3^{[3]}]	[3^{[3,3]}]
Tetrahedron symmetry	[ ] (order 2)	[ ] (order 2)	[3] (order 6)	[ ] (order 2)	[ ] (order 2)	[ ] (order 2)	[ ] (order 2)	[3,3] (order 24)
Extended symmetry	[1[6,3^{1,1}]] =[6,3,4]	[1[3,4^{1,1}]] =[3,4,4]	[3[4^{1,1,1}]] =[4,4,3]	[1[3,3^{[3]}]] =[3,3,6]	[1[4,3^{[3]}]] =[4,3,6]	[1[5,3^{[3]}]] =[5,3,6]	[1[6,3^{[3]}]] =[6,3,6]	[(3,3)[3^{[3,3]}]] =[6,3,3]

== Rational solutions ==
There are hundreds of rational solutions for the 3-sphere, including these 6 linear graphs which generate the Schläfli-Hess polychora, and 11 nonlinear ones from Coxeter:

Linear graphs: 1. Density 4: [3,5,5/2]; 2. Density 6: [5,5/2,5]; 3. Density 20: [5,3,5/2]; 4. Density 66: [5/2,5,5/2]; 5. Density 76: [5,5/2,3]; 6. Density 191: [3,3,5/2]	Loop-n-tail graphs: 1. Density 2: 2. Density 3: 3. Density 5: 4. Density 8: 5. Density 9: 6. Density 14: 7. Density 26: 8. Density 30: 9. Density 39: 10. Density 46: 11. Density 115:

In all, there are 59 sporadic tetrahedra with rational angles, and 2 infinite families.

== See also ==
- Point group for n-simplex solutions on (n−1)-sphere.
