= Paul Halcke =

German mathematician and writer (1662-1731)

Paul Halcke (also: Halcken or Halke), born 1662 in Elmshorn, died 1731 in Buxtehude was a German mathematician, writer, computer, and calendar maker.

He was the brother of writer and computer Johann Halcke and founded, in 1690, together with Heinrich Meißner, the Hamburgischen Kunst-Rechnungs lieb- und übenden Societät, today's Hamburg Mathematical Society. Since about 1687 he was writer and calculator at the city school of Buxtehude.

In 1694 he issued a solution's book to a collection of exercises by Heinrich Meißner, and later he published his own collection of 574 exercises from mathematics and astronomy, entitled Mathematischer Sinnen-Confect ("mathematical mind candy"), which was translated in various languages and remained a seminal textbook for more than a century. The exercises were enriched by poems and descriptions of the solving methods. In particular, exercise 289 on page 256 consists in finding the smallest Euler brick, for which Paul Halcke is most well-known today. This cuboid has sides and face diagonals of integer lengths {44, 117, 240} and {125, 244, 267}.

He also edited several popular calendars for the years 1705, 1707, 1715, 1716 and 1725.
