= Quadrant (plane geometry) =

Coordinate system

The four quadrants of a Cartesian coordinate system

The axes of a two-dimensional Cartesian system divide the plane into four infinite regions, called quadrants, each bounded by two half-axes. The axes themselves are, in general, not part of the respective quadrants.

These are often numbered from 1st to 4th and denoted by Roman numerals: I (where the signs of the (x; y) coordinates are I (+; +), II (−; +), III (−; −), and IV (+; −). When the axes are drawn according to the mathematical custom, the numbering goes counter-clockwise starting from the upper right ("northeast") quadrant.

== Mnemonic ==
In the above graphic, the words in quotation marks are a mnemonic for remembering which three trigonometric functions (sine, cosine, tangent and their reciprocals) are positive in each quadrant. The expression reads "All Science Teachers Crazy" and proceeding counterclockwise from the upper right quadrant, we see that "All" functions are positive in quadrant I, "Science" (for sine) is positive in quadrant II, "Teachers" (for tangent) is positive in quadrant III, and "Crazy" (for cosine) is positive in quadrant IV. There are several variants of this mnemonic.

Signs of trigonometric functions in each quadrant

== See also ==
- Half-plane
- Octant (solid geometry)
- Orthant
- Ray (geometry)
