= Octant of a sphere =

Spherical triangle with three right angles

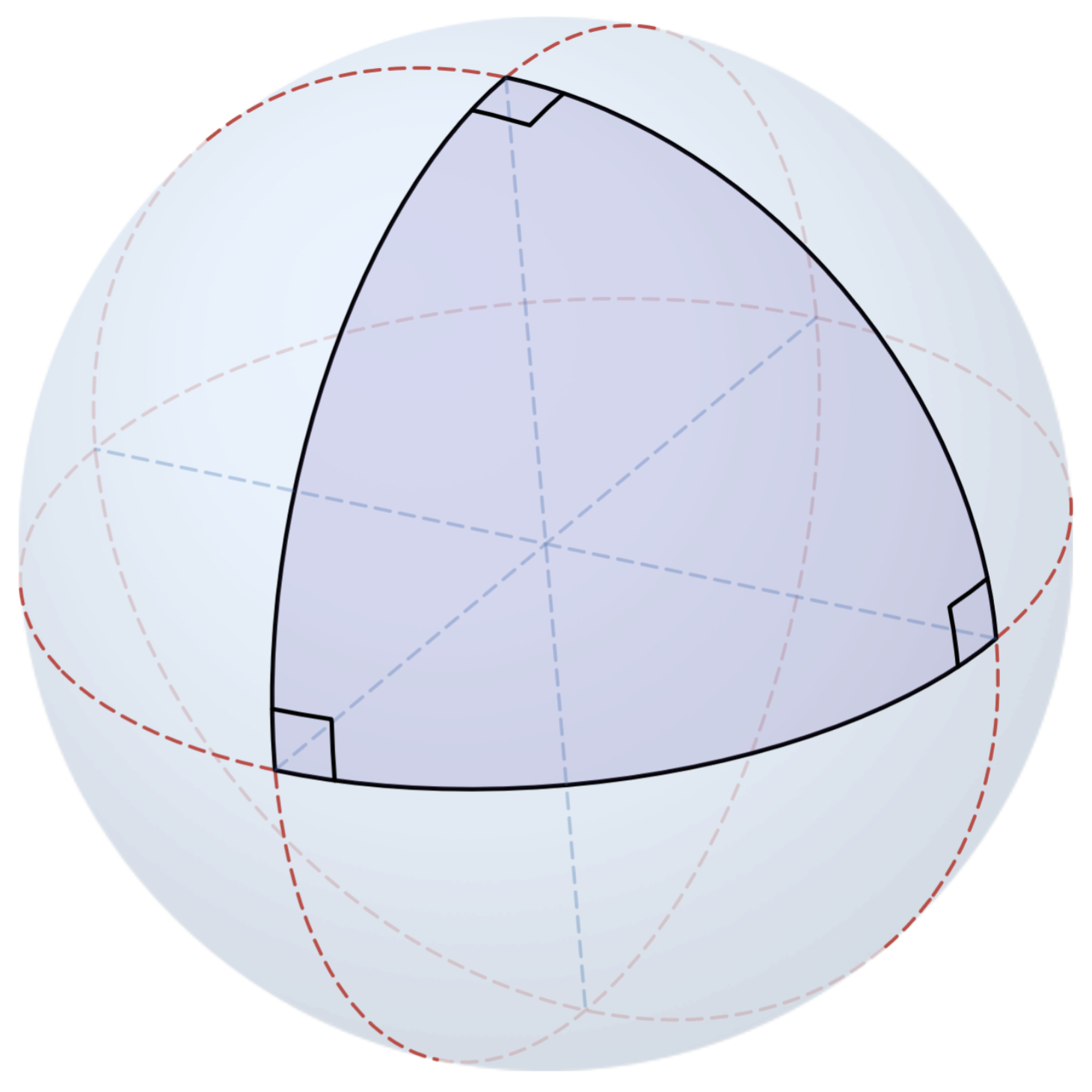
An octant of the sphere in orthographic projection

In geometry, an octant of a sphere is a spherical triangle with three right angles and three right sides. It is sometimes called a trirectangular (spherical) triangle. It is one face of a spherical octahedron.

For a sphere embedded in three-dimensional Euclidean space, the vectors from the sphere's center to each vertex of an octant are the basis vectors of a Cartesian coordinate system relative to which the sphere is a unit sphere. The spherical octant itself is the intersection of the sphere with one octant of space.

Uniquely among spherical triangles, the octant is its own polar triangle.

The octant can be parametrized using a rational quartic Bézier triangle.

The solid angle subtended by a spherical octant is π/2 steradian or one-eighth of a spat, the solid angle of a full sphere.

== See also ==
- Hemisphere (geometry)
- Trirectangular tetrahedron
