= Octant (solid geometry) =

One of eight divisions of a Euclidean 3D coordinate system

Three axial planes (x=0, y=0, z=0) divide space into eight octants. The eight (±,±,±) coordinates of the cube vertices are used to denote them. The horizontal plane shows the four quadrants between x- and y-axis. (Vertex numbers are little-endian balanced ternary.)

An octant in solid geometry is one of the eight divisions of a Euclidean three-dimensional coordinate system defined by the signs of the coordinates. It is analogous to the two-dimensional quadrant and the one-dimensional ray. The generalization of an octant is called orthant or hyperoctant.

== Naming and numbering ==
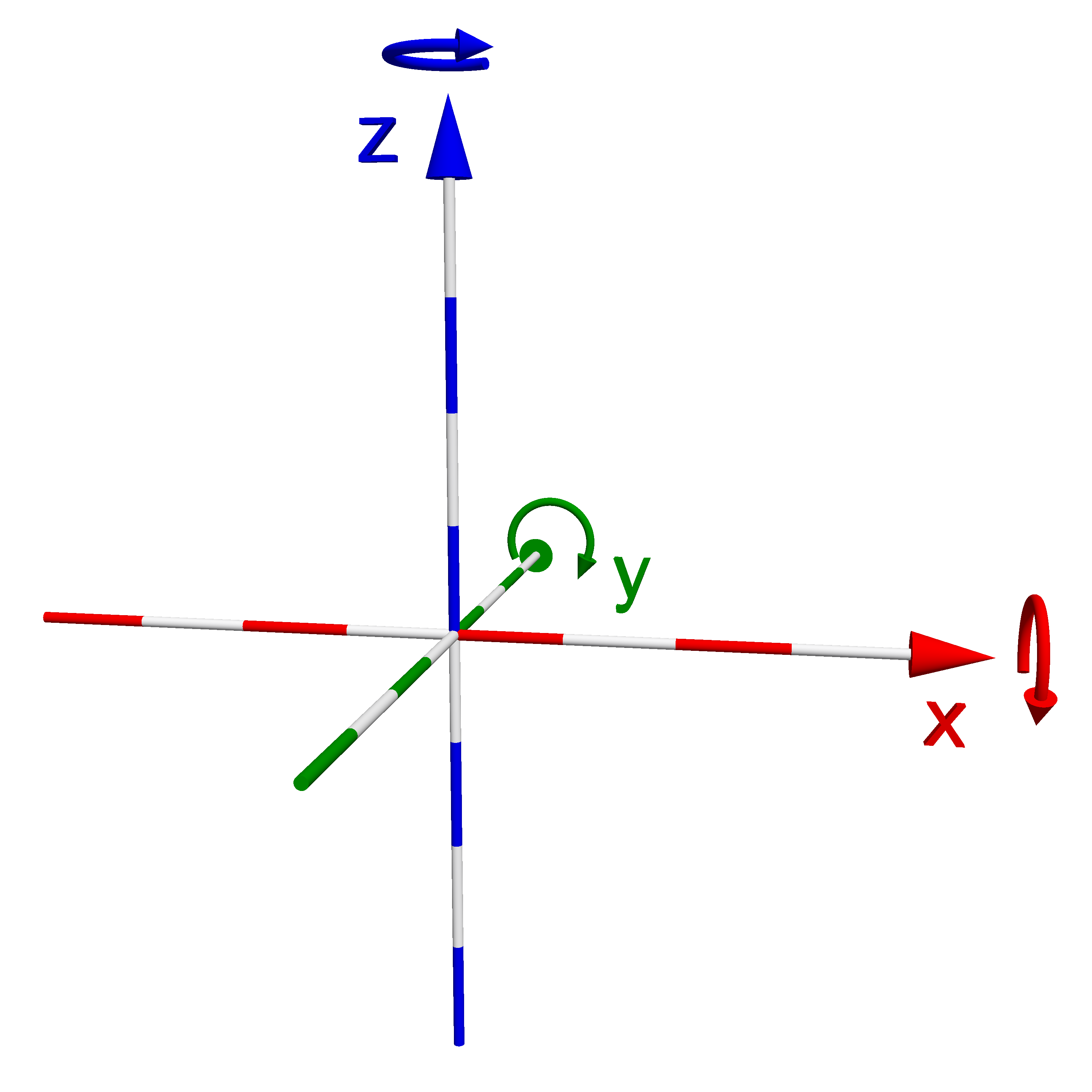
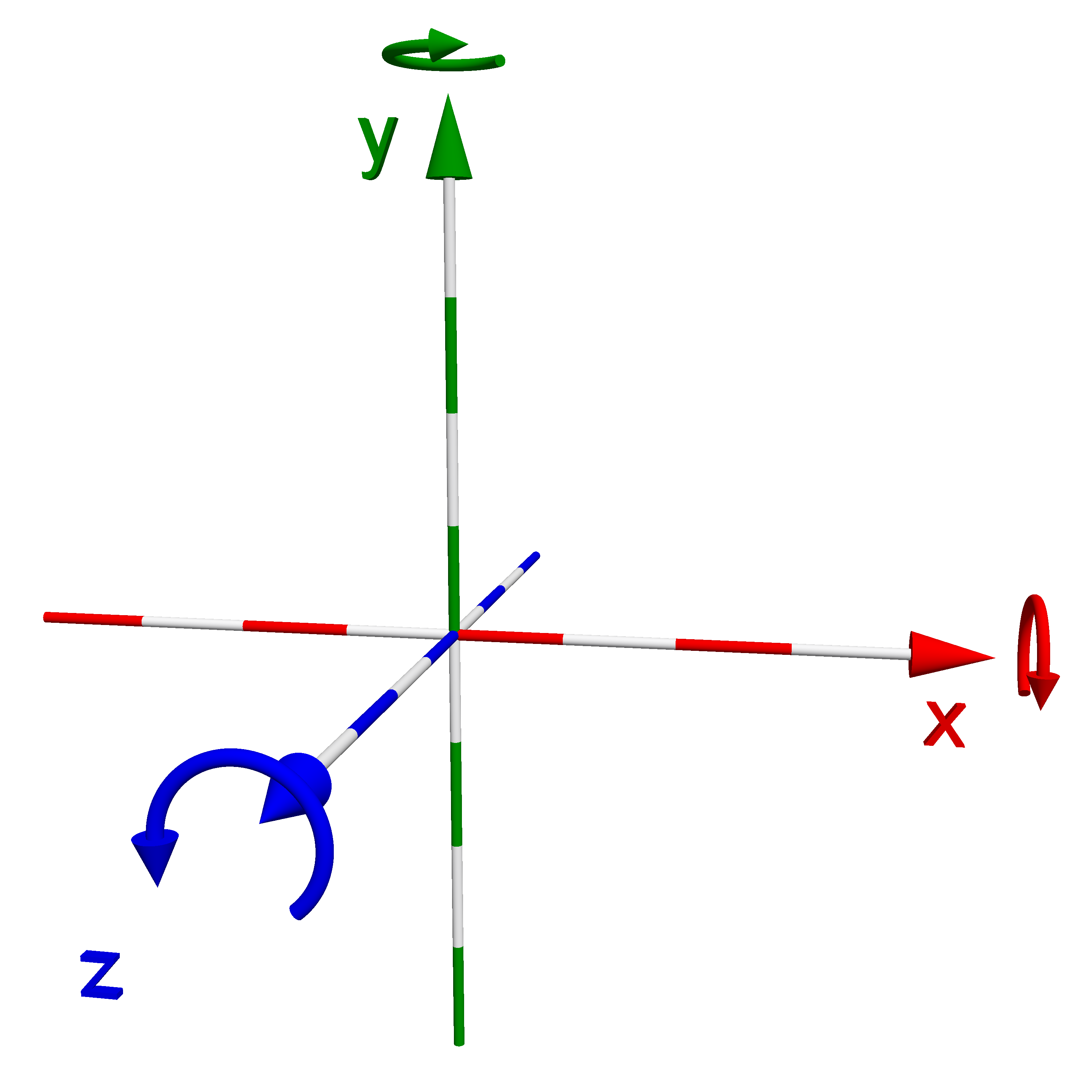
Two representations of a right-hand coordinate system. The first one corresponds to the cube image.

A convention for naming an octant is to give its list of signs, e.g. (+,−,−) or (−,+,−). Octant (+,+,+) is sometimes referred to as the first octant, although similar ordinal name descriptors are not defined for the other seven octants. The advantages of using the (±,±,±) notation are its unambiguousness, and extensibility for higher dimensions.

The following table shows the sign tuples together with likely ways to enumerate them. A binary enumeration with − as 1 can be easily generalized across dimensions. A binary enumeration with + as 1 defines the same order as balanced ternary. The Roman enumeration of the quadrants is in Gray code order, so the corresponding Gray code is also shown for the octants.

Octants
Gray code	x	y	z	Binary				Balanced ternary	
Gray code	x	y	z	− as 1		+ as 1		Balanced ternary	
Gray code	x	y	z	<	>	<	>	<	>
0	+	+	+	0	0	7	7	13	13
1	−	+	+	1	4	6	3	11	−5
3	+	−	+	2	2	5	5	7	7
2	−	−	+	3	6	4	1	5	−11
7	+	+	−	4	1	3	6	−5	11
6	−	+	−	5	5	2	2	−7	−7
4	+	−	−	6	3	1	4	−11	5
5	−	−	−	7	7	0	0	−13	−13

Quadrants for comparison
Roman	x	y	Binary				Balanced ternary	
Roman	x	y	− as 1		+ as 1		Balanced ternary	
Roman	x	y	<	>	<	>	<	>
I	+	+	0	0	3	3	4	4
II	−	+	1	2	2	1	2	−2
IV	+	−	2	1	1	2	−2	2
III	−	−	3	3	0	0	−4	−4

Little- and big-endian are marked by "<" and ">", respectively.

Verbal descriptions are ambiguous, because they depend on the representation of the coordinate system. In the two depicted representations of a right-hand coordinate system, the first octant could be called right-back-top or right-top-front respectively.

== See also ==
- Octant (plane geometry)
- Octree
- Orthant
- Quadrant (plane geometry)
- Spherical octant, the intersection of an octant of space and a sphere
- Trirectangular tetrahedron
