= Euler brick =

Cuboid whose edges and face diagonals have integer lengths

In mathematics, an Euler brick, named after Leonhard Euler, is a rectangular cuboid whose edges and face diagonals all have integer lengths. A primitive Euler brick is an Euler brick whose edge lengths are relatively prime. A perfect Euler brick is one whose space diagonal is also an integer, but such a brick has not yet been found.

Euler brick with edges a, b, c and face diagonals d, e, f

== Definition ==
The definition of an Euler brick in geometric terms is equivalent to a solution to the following system of Diophantine equations:

$$\begin{cases} a^2 + b^2 = d^2\\ a^2 + c^2 = e^2\\ b^2 + c^2 = f^2\end{cases}$$

where a, b, c are the edges and d, e, f are the diagonals.

== Properties ==
- If (a, b, c) is a solution, then (ka, kb, kc) is also a solution for any k. Consequently, the solutions in rational numbers are all rescalings of integer solutions. Given an Euler brick with edge-lengths (a, b, c), the triple (bc, ac, ab) constitutes an Euler brick as well.
- Exactly one edge and two face diagonals of a primitive Euler brick are odd.
- At least two edges of an Euler brick are divisible by 3.
- At least two edges of an Euler brick are divisible by 4.
- At least one edge of an Euler brick is divisible by 11.

== Examples ==
The smallest Euler brick, discovered by Paul Halcke in 1719, has edges (a, b, c) = (44, 117, 240) and face diagonals (d, e, f ) = (125, 244, 267). Some other small primitive solutions, given as edges (a, b, c) — face diagonals (d, e, f), are below:

All five primitive Euler bricks with dimensions under 1000

(	85,	132,	720	) — (	157,	725,	732	)
(	140,	480,	693	) — (	500,	707,	843	)
(	160,	231,	792	) — (	281,	808,	825	)
(	187,	1020,	1584	) — (	1037,	1595,	1884	)
(	195,	748,	6336	) — (	773,	6339,	6380	)
(	240,	252,	275	) — (	348,	365,	373	)
(	429,	880,	2340	) — (	979,	2379,	2500	)
(	495,	4888,	8160	) — (	4913,	8175,	9512	)
(	528,	5796,	6325	) — (	5820,	6347,	8579	)

== Generating formula ==
Euler found at least two parametric solutions to the problem, but neither gives all solutions.

An infinitude of Euler bricks can be generated with Saunderson's parametric formula. Let (u, v, w) be a Pythagorean triple (that is, u^{2} + v^{2} = w^{2}.) Then the edges

$$a=u|4v^2-w^2| ,\quad b=v|4u^2-w^2|, \quad c=4uvw$$

give face diagonals

$$d=w^3, \quad e=u(4v^2+w^2), \quad f=v(4u^2+w^2).$$

There are many Euler bricks which are not parametrized as above, for instance the Euler brick with edges (a, b, c) = (240, 252, 275) and face diagonals (d, e, f ) = (348, 365, 373).

== Perfect cuboid ==
Unsolved problem in mathematics
Does a perfect cuboid exist?
More unsolved problems in mathematics

A perfect cuboid (also called a perfect Euler brick or perfect box) is an Euler brick whose space diagonal also has integer length. In other words, the following equation is added to the system of Diophantine equations defining an Euler brick:

$$a^2 + b^2 + c^2 = g^2,$$

where g is the space diagonal. As of March 2020, no example of a perfect cuboid had been found and no one has proven that none exist.

Euler brick with edges a, b, c and face diagonals d, e, f along with space diagonal g

Exhaustive computer searches show that, if a perfect cuboid exists,

- the odd edge must be greater than 2.5 × 10^{13},
- the smallest edge must be greater than 5×10^{11}, and
- the space diagonal must be greater than 9 × 10^{15}.

Some facts are known about properties that must be satisfied by a primitive perfect cuboid, if one exists, based on modular arithmetic:

- One edge, two face diagonals and the space diagonal must be odd, one edge and the remaining face diagonal must be divisible by 4, and the remaining edge must be divisible by 16.
- Two edges must have length divisible by 3 and at least one of those edges must have length divisible by 9.
- One edge must have length divisible by 5.
- One edge must have length divisible by 7.
- One edge must have length divisible by 11.
- One edge must have length divisible by 19.
- One edge or space diagonal must be divisible by 13.
- One edge, face diagonal or space diagonal must be divisible by 17.
- One edge, face diagonal or space diagonal must be divisible by 29.
- One edge, face diagonal or space diagonal must be divisible by 37.

In addition:

- The space diagonal is neither a prime power nor a product of two primes.
- The space diagonal can only contain prime divisors that are congruent to 1 modulo 4.

=== Heronian triangles ===
If a perfect cuboid exists with edges $a, b, c$, corresponding face diagonals $d, e, f$, and space diagonal $g$, then the following Heronian triangles exist:

- A Heronian triangle with side lengths $(d^2, e^2, f^2)$, an area of $abcg$, and rational angle bisectors.
- An acute Heronian triangle with side lengths $(af, be, cd)$ and an area of $\frac{abcg}{2}$.
- Obtuse Heronian triangles with side lengths $(bf, ae, gd)$, $(ad, cf, ge)$, and $(ce, bd, gf)$, each with an area of $\frac{abcg}{2}$.
- Right Heronian triangles with side lengths $(ab, cg, ef)$, $(ac, bg, df)$, and $(bc, ag, de)$, each with an area of $\frac{abcg}{2}$.

=== Cuboid conjectures ===
Three cuboid conjectures are three mathematical propositions claiming irreducibility of three univariate polynomials with integer coefficients depending on several integer parameters. The conjectures are related to the perfect cuboid problem. Though they are not equivalent to the perfect cuboid problem, if all of these three conjectures are true, then no perfect cuboids exist. They are neither proved nor disproved.

Cuboid conjecture 1. For any two positive coprime integer numbers $a \neq u$ the eighth degree polynomial

$P_{au}(t)=t^8+6\,(u^2-a^2)\,t^6+(a^4-4\,a^2\,u^2+u^4)\,t^4-6\,a^2\,u^2\,(u^2-a^2)\,t^2+u^4\,a^4$	1

is irreducible over the ring of integers $\mathbb Z$.

Cuboid conjecture 2. For any two positive coprime integer numbers $p \neq q$ the tenth-degree polynomial

$$\begin{align} Q_{pq}(t)= {} & t^{10}+(2q^2+p^2)(3q^2-2p^2)t^8 \\[4pt] & {} +(q^8+10p^2q^6+4p^4q^4-14p^6q^2+p^8)t^6\\[4pt] & {} -p^2 q^2(q^8-14p^2q^6+4p^4q^4+10p^6\,q^2+p^8)t^4 \\[4pt] & {} -p^6\,q^6\,(q^2+2\,p^2)\,(-2\,q^2+3\,p^2)\,t^2\\[4pt] & {} -q^{10}\,p^{10} \end{align}$$	2

is irreducible over the ring of integers $\mathbb Z$.

Cuboid conjecture 3. For any three positive coprime integer numbers $a$, $b$, $u$ such that none of the conditions

$\begin{array}{lcr} \text{1)}\qquad a=b;\qquad\qquad & \text{3)}\qquad b\,u=a^2;\qquad\qquad &\text{5)}\qquad a=u;\\ \text{2)}\qquad a=b=u;\qquad\qquad &\text{4)}\qquad a\,u=b^2;\qquad\qquad &\text{6)}\qquad b=u \end{array}$	3

are fulfilled, the twelfth-degree polynomial

$$\begin{align} P_{abu}(t) = {} & t^{12}+(6u^2-2a^2-2b^2)t^{10} \\ & {} + (u^4+b^4+a^4+4a^2u^2+4b^2u^2-12b^2 a^2)t^8 \\ & {} + (6a^4u^2+6u^2b^4-8a^2b^2u^2-2u^4a^2-2u^4b^2-2a^4b^2-2b^4a^2)t^6 \\ & {} + (4u^2b^4a^2+4a^4u^2b^2-12u^4a^2b^2+u^4a^4+u^4b^4+a^4b^4)t^4 \\ & {} + (6a^4u^2b^4-2u^4a^4b^2-2u^4a^2b^4)t^2+u^4a^4b^4. \end{align}$$	4

is irreducible over the ring of integers $\mathbb Z$.

== Almost-perfect cuboids ==
An almost-perfect cuboid has 6 out of the 7 lengths as rational. Such cuboids can be sorted into three types, called body, edge, and face cuboids. In the case of the body cuboid, the body (space) diagonal g is irrational. For the edge cuboid, one of the edges a, b, c is irrational. The face cuboid has one of the face diagonals d, e, f irrational.

The body cuboid is commonly referred to as the Euler cuboid in honor of Leonhard Euler, who discussed this type of cuboid. He was also aware of face cuboids, and provided the (104, 153, 672) example. The three integer cuboid edge lengths and three integer diagonal lengths of a face cuboid can also be interpreted as the edge lengths of a Heronian tetrahedron that is also a Schläfli orthoscheme. There are infinitely many face cuboids, and infinitely many Heronian orthoschemes.

The smallest solutions for each type of almost-perfect cuboids, given as edges, face diagonals and the space diagonal (a, b, c, d, e, f, g), are as follows:

- Body cuboid: (44, 117, 240, 125, 244, 267, √73225)
- Edge cuboid: (520, 576, √618849, 776, 943, 975, 1105)
- Face cuboid: (104, 153, 672, 185, 680, √474993, 697)

As of July 2020, there are 167,043 found cuboids with the smallest integer edge less than 200,000,000,027: 61,042 are Euler (body) cuboids, 16,612 are edge cuboids with a complex number edge length, 32,286 were edge cuboids, and 57,103 were face cuboids.

As of December 2017, an exhaustive search counted all edge and face cuboids with the smallest integer space diagonal less than 1,125,899,906,842,624: 194,652 were edge cuboids, 350,778 were face cuboids.

== Perfect parallelepiped ==
A perfect parallelepiped is a parallelepiped with integer-length edges, face diagonals, and body diagonals, but not necessarily with all right angles; a perfect cuboid is a special case of a perfect parallelepiped. In 2009, dozens of perfect parallelepipeds were shown to exist, answering an open question of Richard Guy. Some of these perfect parallelepipeds have two rectangular faces. The smallest perfect parallelepiped has edges 271, 106, and 103; short face diagonals 101, 266, and 255; long face diagonals 183, 312, and 323; and body diagonals 374, 300, 278, and 272.

== Connection to elliptic curves ==
In 2022, Aubrey de Grey published an exploration of perfect isosceles rectangular frusta, which he termed "plinths". These are hexahedra with two rectangular faces of the same aspect ratio and four faces that are isosceles trapezia. Thus, as for almost-perfect cuboids and perfect parallelepipeds, a perfect cuboid would be a special case of a perfect plinth. Perfect plinths exist, but are much rarer for a given size than perfect parallelepipeds or almost-perfect cuboids. In a subsequent paper, de Grey, Philip Gibbs and Louie Helm built on this finding to explore classes of elliptic curve that correspond to perfect plinths, almost-perfect cuboids, and other generalisations of perfect cuboids. By this means they dramatically increased the range up to which perfect cuboids can be sought computationally. They also showed that a large proportion of Pythagorean triples cannot form a face of a perfect cuboid, by identifying several families of elliptic curves that must have positive rank if a perfect cuboid exists. Independently, Paulsen and West showed that a perfect cuboid must correspond to a congruent number elliptic curve of rank at least 2.

== See also ==
- Pythagorean quadruple
