= Schläfli orthoscheme =

Simplex formed from a right-angled path

In geometry, a Schläfli orthoscheme is a type of simplex. The orthoscheme is the generalization of the right triangle to simplex figures of any number of dimensions. Orthoschemes are defined by a sequence of edges $(v_0v_1), (v_1v_2), \dots, (v_{d-1}v_d) \,$ that are mutually orthogonal. They were introduced by Ludwig Schläfli, who called them orthoschemes and studied their volume in Euclidean, hyperbolic, and spherical geometries. H. S. M. Coxeter later named them after Schläfli. As right triangles provide the basis for trigonometry, orthoschemes form the basis of a trigonometry of n dimensions, as developed by Schoute who called it polygonometry. J.-P. Sydler and Børge Jessen studied orthoschemes extensively in connection with Hilbert's third problem.

Orthoschemes, also called path-simplices in the applied mathematics literature, are a special case of a more general class of simplices studied by Fiedler, and later rediscovered by Coxeter. These simplices are the convex hulls of trees in which all edges are mutually perpendicular. In an orthoscheme, the underlying tree is a path.

In three dimensions, an orthoscheme is also called a birectangular tetrahedron (because its path makes two right angles at vertices each having two right angles) or a quadrirectangular tetrahedron (because it contains four right angles).

== Properties ==
Isometric projection of Euler's Heronian birectangular tetrahedron in its minimum bounding box

- All 2-faces are right triangles.
- All facets of a d-dimensional orthoscheme are (d − 1)-dimensional orthoschemes.
- The $d$ dihedral angles that are disjoint from edges of the path have acute angles; the remaining $\tbinom{d}{2}$ dihedral angles are all right angles.
- The midpoint of the longest edge is the center of the circumscribed sphere.
- The case when $|v_0v_1|=|v_1v_2|=\cdots = |v_{d-1}v_d|$ is a generalized Hill tetrahedron.
- Every hypercube in d-dimensional space can be dissected into d! congruent orthoschemes. A similar dissection into the same number of orthoschemes applies more generally to every hyperrectangle but in this case the orthoschemes may not be congruent.
- Every regular polytope can be dissected radially into g congruent orthoschemes that meet at its center, where g is the order of the regular polytope's symmetry group.
- Every orthoscheme can be trisected into three smaller orthoschemes.
- In 3-dimensional hyperbolic and spherical spaces, the volume of orthoschemes can be expressed in terms of the Lobachevsky function, or in terms of dilogarithms.

== Dissection into orthoschemes ==
A cube dissected into six orthoschemes.

Hugo Hadwiger conjectured in 1956 that every simplex can be dissected into finitely many orthoschemes. The conjecture has been proved in spaces of five or fewer dimensions, but remains unsolved in higher dimensions.

Hadwiger's conjecture implies that every convex polytope can be dissected into orthoschemes.

== Characteristic simplex of the general regular polytope ==
Coxeter identifies various orthoschemes as the characteristic simplexes of the polytopes they generate by reflections. The characteristic simplex is the polytope's fundamental building block. It can be replicated by reflections or rotations to construct the polytope, just as the polytope can be dissected into some integral number of it. The characteristic simplex is chiral (it comes in two mirror-image forms which are different), and the polytope is dissected into an equal number of left- and right-hand instances of it. It has dissimilar edge lengths and faces, instead of the equilateral triangle faces of the regular simplex. When the polytope is regular, its characteristic simplex is an orthoscheme, a simplex with only right triangle faces.

Every regular polytope has its characteristic orthoscheme which is its fundamental region, the irregular simplex which has exactly the same symmetry characteristics as the regular polytope but captures them all without repetition. For a regular k-polytope, the Coxeter-Dynkin diagram of the characteristic k-orthoscheme is the k-polytope's diagram without the generating point ring. The regular k-polytope is subdivided by its symmetry (k-1)-elements into g instances of its characteristic k-orthoscheme that surround its center, where g is the order of the k-polytope's symmetry group. This is a barycentric subdivision.

We proceed to describe the "simplicial subdivision" of a regular polytope, beginning with the one-dimensional case. The segment 𝚷_{1} is divided into two equal parts by its centre 𝚶_{1}. The polygon 𝚷_{2} = {p} is divided by its lines of symmetry into 2p right-angled triangles, which join the center 𝚶_{2} to the simplicially subdivided sides. The polyhedron 𝚷_{3} = {p, q} is divided by its planes of symmetry into g quadrirectangular tetrahedra (see 5.43), which join the centre 𝚶_{3} to the simplicially subdivided faces. Analogously, the general regular polytope 𝚷_{n} is divided into a number of congruent simplexes ([orthoschemes]) which join the centre 𝚶_{n} to the simplicially subdivided cells.

== See also ==
- 3-orthoscheme (tetrahedron with right-triangle faces)
- 4-orthoscheme (5-cell with right-triangle faces)
- Goursat tetrahedron
- Order polytope
