= Trirectangular tetrahedron =

Tetrahedron where all three face angles at one vertex are right angles

A trirectangular tetrahedron with its base shown in green and its apex as a solid black disk. It can be constructed by a coordinate octant and a plane crossing all 3 axes away from the origin (x>0; y>0; z>0) and x/a+y/b+z/c<1

In geometry, a trirectangular tetrahedron is a tetrahedron where all three face angles at one vertex are right angles. That vertex is called the right angle or apex of the trirectangular tetrahedron and the face opposite it is called the base. The three edges that meet at the right angle are called the legs and the perpendicular from the right angle to the base is called the altitude of the tetrahedron (analogous to the altitude of a triangle).

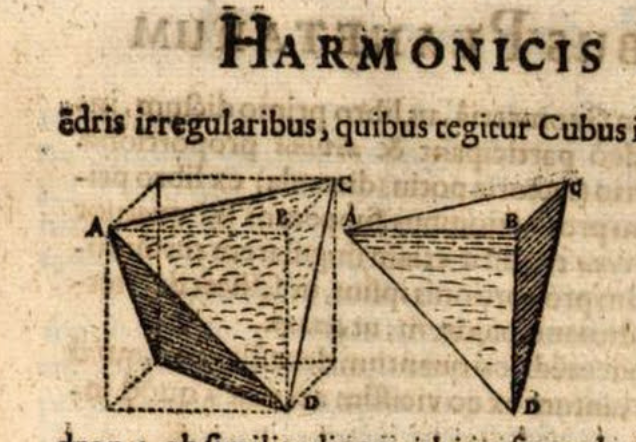
Kepler's drawing of a regular tetrahedron inscribed in a cube (on the left), and one of the four trirectangular tetrahedra that surround it (on the right), filling the cube.

An example of a trirectangular tetrahedron is a truncated solid figure near the corner of a cube or an octant at the origin of Euclidean space. Kepler discovered the relationship between the cube, regular tetrahedron and trirectangular tetrahedron.

Only the bifurcating graph of the $B_3$ affine Coxeter group has a Trirectangular tetrahedron fundamental domain.

== Metric formulas ==
If the legs have lengths x, y, z then the trirectangular tetrahedron has the volume

$$V=\frac{xyz}{6}.$$

The altitude h satisfies

$$\frac{1}{h^2}=\frac{1}{x^2}+\frac{1}{y^2}+\frac{1}{z^2}.$$

The area $T_0$ of the base is given by

$$T_0=\frac{xyz}{2h}.$$

The solid angle at the right-angled vertex, from which the opposite face (the base) subtends an octant, has measure π/2 steradians, one eighth of the surface area of a unit sphere.

== De Gua's theorem ==
If the area of the base is $T_0$ and the areas of the three other (right-angled) faces are $T_1$, $T_2$ and $T_3$, then

$$T_0^2=T_1^2+T_2^2+T_3^2.$$

This is a generalization of the Pythagorean theorem to a tetrahedron.

== Integer solution ==
=== Integer edges ===
Trirectangular tetrahedra with integer legs $a,b,c$ and sides $d=\sqrt{b^2+c^2}, e=\sqrt{a^2+c^2}, f=\sqrt{a^2+b^2}$ of the base triangle exist, e.g. $a=240,b=117,c=44,d=125,e=244,f=267$ (discovered 1719 by Halcke). Here are a few more examples with integer legs and sides.

    a        b        c        d        e        f 

   240      117       44      125      244      267
   275      252      240      348      365      373
   480      234       88      250      488      534
   550      504      480      696      730      746
   693      480      140      500      707      843
   720      351      132      375      732      801
   720      132       85      157      725      732
   792      231      160      281      808      825
   825      756      720     1044     1095     1119
   960      468      176      500      976     1068
  1100     1008      960     1392     1460     1492
  1155     1100     1008     1492     1533     1595
  1200      585      220      625     1220     1335
  1375     1260     1200     1740     1825     1865
  1386      960      280     1000     1414     1686
  1440      702      264      750     1464     1602
  1440      264      170      314     1450     1464

Notice that some of these are multiples of smaller ones. Note also A031173.

=== Integer faces ===
Trirectangular tetrahedra with integer faces $T_c, T_a, T_b, T_0$ and altitude h exist, e.g. $a=42,b=28,c=14,T_c=588,T_a=196,T_b=294,T_0=686,h=12$ without or $a=156,b=80,c=65,T_c=6240,T_a=2600,T_b=5070,T_0=8450,h=48$ with coprime $a,b,c$.

== See also ==
- Euler Brick
- Irregular tetrahedra
- Standard simplex
