= Andreini =

Andreini is an Italian surname. Notable people with the surname include:

- Alfredo Andreini (1870–1943), Italian physician and entomologist and discoverer of 25 of the convex uniform honeycombs (also called Andreini tessellations) in 1900
- Eddie Andreini (1937–2014), American aerobatic pilot
- Elios Andreini (1940–2022), Italian politician
- Francesco Andreini (c. 1548–1624), Italian actor
- Francesco Andreini (painter) (1697–1751), Italian painter
- Giambattista Andreini (1576–1654), Italian playwright and actor
- Isabella Andreini (1562–1604), Italian actress
- Marco Andreini (born 1961), retired Italian pole vaulter
- Matteo Andreini (born 1981), Sammarinese footballer
- Reno Andreini (1875-1880–after 1924), Italian operatic tenor
- Virginia Ramponi-Andreini, also known by her stage name "La Florinda" (1583–c.1630), celebrated Italian actress and singer

== See also ==
- Villino Andreini, Art Nouveau villa in Grosseto, Italy
