= Mario Bezzi =

Italian professor of zoology

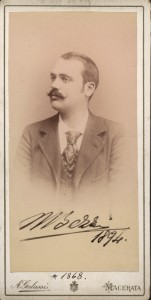
Mario Bezzi

Mario Bezzi (1 August 1868, in Milan – 14 January 1927, in Turin) was an Italian professor of zoology at the University of Turin. He was also director of the Turin Museum of Natural History (Museo Regionale di Scienze Naturali (Regional Museum of Natural Sciences), Torino). He was a Doctor of Science.

Bezzi worked with Paul Stein, Theodor Becker and Kálmán Kertész on Katalog der Paläarktischen dipteren published in Budapest from 1903.

== Works ==
(partial list)

- Diptera Brachycera and Athericera of the Fiji islands based on material in the British Museum [Natural History]. British Museum [Nat. Hist.], London: viii + 220 pp. (1928).
- Einige neue paläarrktische Empis-Arten. Pt. 1 18pp. (1909)
- Report on a collection of Bombyliidae from Central Africa 52 p. 1 pl (1911)
- Riduzione e scomparsa delle ali negli insetti ditteri 98 p. 11 figs (1916)
- Voyage Alluaud en Afrique Orientale. Bombyliidae & Syrphidae 35 p (1923)
- Ulteriori notizie sulla ditterofauna delle caverne. Atti Soc. Ven. -Trent. Sci. nat. 46: 177–187. (1907)
- Ditteri Eritrei raccolti dal Dott. Andreini e dal Prof. Tellini. Parte Seconda [1]. Boll. Soc. ent. ital. 39[1907]: 3–199. 1908
- Diptères suivi d'un Appendice sur les Diptères cavernicoles recueillis par le Dr Absolon dans les Balcans. Arch. Zool. Exp. Gèn. 48: 1–87. (1911)
- Ditteri raccolti dal Prof. F. Silvestri durante il suo viaggio in Africa. Boll. Lab. Zool. gen. agr. Portici 8: 279–[281](1914).
- Contributo allo studio della fauna Libica. Materiali raccolti nelle zone di Misurata e Homs [1912–13] dal Dott. Alfredo Andreini, Capitano Medico. Ditteri. Annali del Museo Civico di Storia naturale di Genova, Serie 3. a 6[46]: 1–17 [?165-181](1914).
- Ditteri di Cirenaica raccolti dal Prof. Alessandro Ghigi durante l'escursione organaizzata dal Touring Club Italiano nel mese d'Aprile 1920. Atti Soc. Ven. -Trent. Sci. nat. 60: 1921:.
- Materiali per lo studio della fauna Tunisia raccolti da G. e L. Doria. Annali del Museo Civico di Storia Naturale di Genova, Serie 3a 10[50] 1922: 1–43. (1922).
- Materiali per una fauna dell'Arcipelago Toscano. XVII. Ditteri del Giglio. Annali del Museo Civico di Storia Naturale di Genova, Serie 3a 10[50] 1925: 291–354 [1–64]1925:.
- Bezzi, M. & C. G. Lamb, 1926: XXIII. Diptera [excluding Nematocera] from the Island of Rodriguez. Trans. ent. Soc. Lond. 3/4]: 537–573 (1925).
- Bezzi, M. & T. de Stefani-Perez, : Enumerazione dei Ditteri fino ad ora raccolti in Sicilia. Naturalista Siciliano An. II [Nuova Serie] 1–3: 1–48. (1897).

== Biographies and Collection Details ==
- Groll, E. K. (Hrsg.): Biografien der Entomologen der Welt : Datenbank. Version 4.15 : Senckenberg Deutsches Entomologisches Institut, 2010 at
