= Khaf =

Khaf may refer to:

- Khaf County, Iran
- Khaf, Iran, the capital of Khaf County
- Kaph (letter)
- Half Moon Bay Airport, whose ICAO code is KHAF
