= Triangular prism =

Prism with a 3-sided base

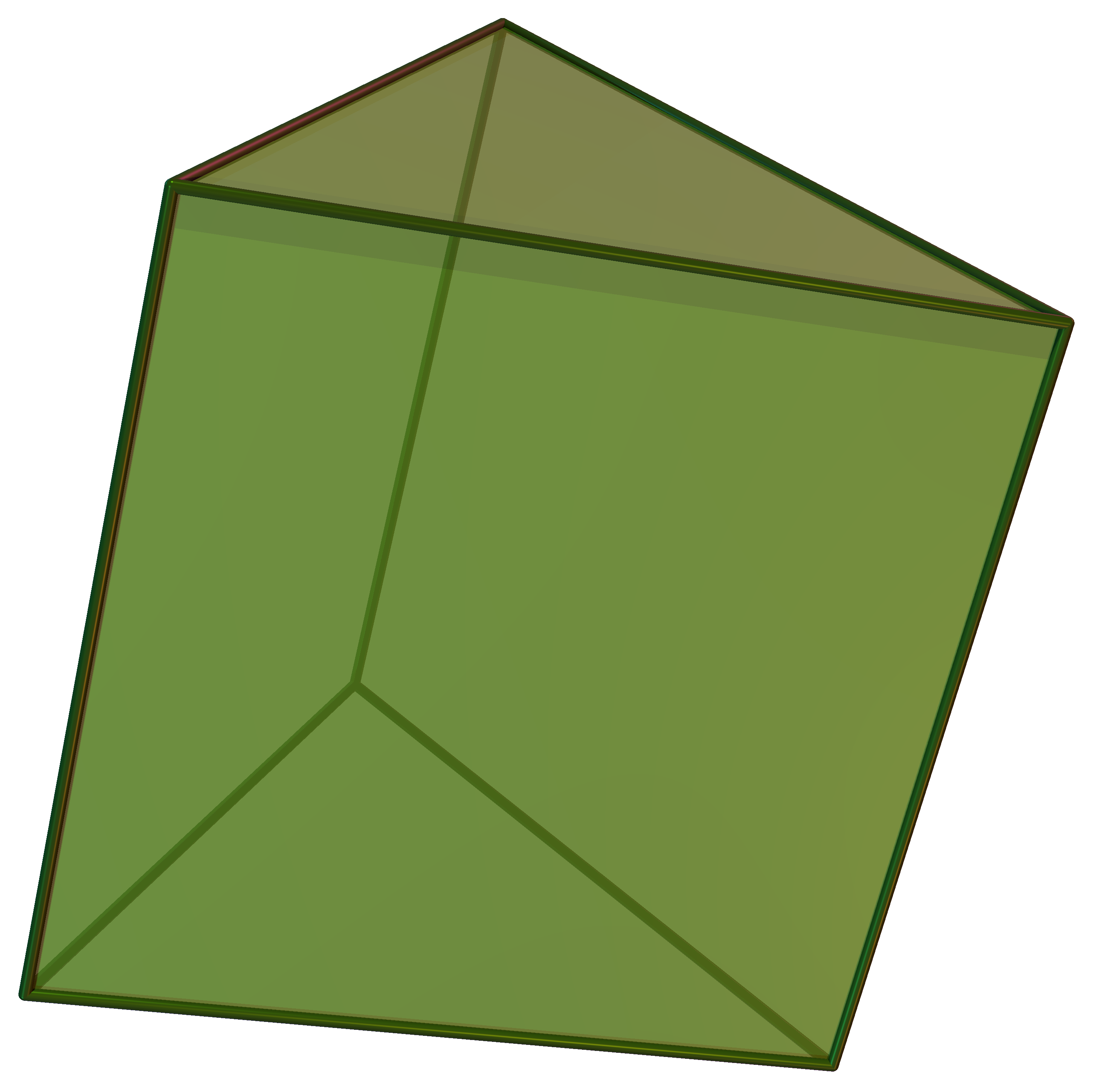
- A uniform triangular prism with equal-length edges
- Type: prism prismatoid plesiohedron semiregular polyhedron uniform polyhedron
- Faces: 2 triangles 3 squares
- Edges: 9
- Vertices: 6
- Symmetry group: D_{3h}
- Dihedral angle (degrees): As a uniform: square-to-square: 60°; square-to-triangle: 90°
- Dual polyhedron: triangular bipyramid
- Properties: As a uniform prism: convex, elementary, and isogonal

Net
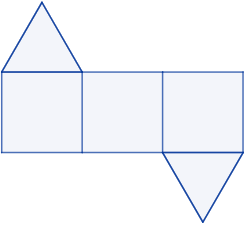
- The net of a uniform triangular prism

In geometry, a triangular prism or trigonal prism is a prism with two triangular bases. It is an elementary polyhedron. If the edges joining matching vertices of the triangles are perpendicular to the base, the prism is a right prism. If the edges are equal in length, a right prism is semiregular, and more generally uniform.

The triangular prism can be used as the core of constructing other polyhedra, examples are some of the Johnson solids and the Schönhardt polyhedron. It has a relationship with the honeycombs and polytopes. It can be found in many real-life applications as in natural science, architecture, and other popular cultures.

== Special cases ==
A triangular prism has six vertices, nine edges, and five faces. Every prism has two congruent faces known as its bases, and the bases of a triangular prism are triangles. The triangle has three vertices, each of which pairs with another triangle's vertex, forming three edges. These edges form three parallelograms as other faces. It is also considered a special case of a wedge, a polyhedron with two triangular and three trapezoidal faces. A triangular prism can have the form of a right prism, meaning that its edges are perpendicular to the base, forming rectangular-shaped lateral faces. Like any-sided prism, it has all vertices lying on the parallel bases, a prismatoid.

The vertices and edges of a triangular prism can give rise to a graph. This is due to Steinitz's theorem, stating that any convex polyhedron can be drawn into a planar graph that is 3-connected, meaning the edges of a graph do not cross each other, and the vertices are impossible to disconnect whenever picking any two vertices to be removed. Classifying into a family, the graph of a triangular prism is the prism graph Π_{3}, where the symbol Π_{n} represents the graph of an n-sided prism. The graph of a triangular prism is a type of planar graph formed from a tree with no degree-two vertices by adding a cycle connecting its leaves, an example of a Halin graph.

The volume of any prism is the product of the area of the base and the distance between the two bases. In the case of a triangular prism, its base is a triangle. The area of a triangle is the half product of its base b and its height h, formulated as 1/2bh. Since the triangular prism has a distance l between two triangular bases, the general formula for its volume is:
$$V = \frac{1}{2}bh \cdot l.$$

=== As a uniform prism ===
3D model of a uniform triangular prism

When all edges are equal in length, its bases and its lateral faces are all equilaterals and squares, respectively. Hence, the triangular prism is semiregular. A semiregular prism means that the number of its polygonal base's edges equals the number of its square faces. More generally, the triangular prism is uniform: the square and equilateral triangular faces are regular polygons, having a symmetry of mapping any two vertices known as isogonal. The dihedral angle between two adjacent square faces is the internal angle of an equilateral triangle π/3 = 60°, and that between a square and a triangle is π/2 = 90°. Its volume can be calculated as the product of the equilateral triangle's area and the distance between bases:
$$V_\text{uniform} = \frac{1}{2} \cdot \frac{\sqrt{3}}{2}l^2 \cdot l = \frac{\sqrt{3}}{4}l^3 \approx 0.433\,l^3$$

The three-dimensional symmetry group of a triangular prism is prismatic symmetry D_{3h} of order 12. Its symmetries include a three-fold axis of symmetry (0°, 120°, and 240°) passing through the two base triangles of the central prism; three two-fold axes (0° and 180°), each passing perpendicularly through one square face of the central prism and perpendicular to the three-fold axis of symmetry; one reflection plane passing perpendicularly through each square face of the central prism; and three vertical reflection planes through one square face of the central prism and its opposite edge. The dual polyhedron of any prism is a bipyramid, a polyhedron formed by fusing two pyramids base-to-base. In the case of a triangular prism, its dual is a triangular bipyramid by two tetrahedra. Both have a common three-dimensional symmetry group.

The uniform triangular prism is an elementary polyhedron: that is, no convex regular-faced polyhedra can be formed by slicing the triangular prism on a plane.

== Applications ==
=== In popular cultures ===
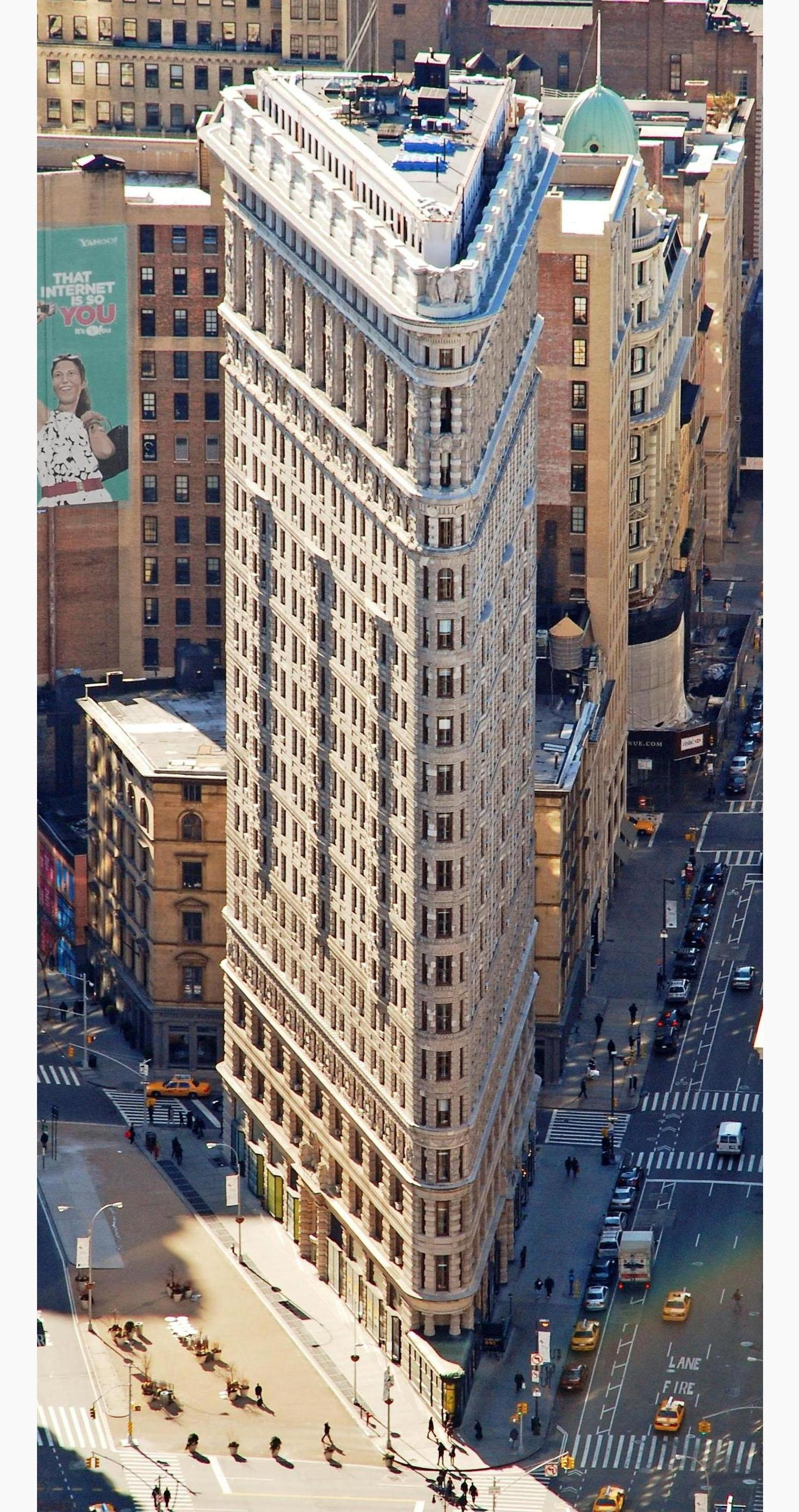
Flatiron Building

In architecture, an example of a building with a triangular prism shape is Flatiron Building in New York City. An instance of food that resembles the shape of a triangular prism is a Swiss chocolate brand of Toblerone.

=== In chemistry ===
The cluster of a chemical compound known as trigonal prismatic molecular geometry describes the group of atoms as the vertices of triangular prism structure, with an example compound being hexamethyltungsten.

The triangular prism is studied as the isomer of a fullerene C_{6}. A suggestion claimed that any polyhedral graph structure is considered as the basis of fullerene. The triangular prism is one of the simplest fullerene structures other than a tetrahedron and some family of prisms (the square prism, the pentagonal prism, the hexagonal prism, and the heptagonal prism). The triangular prism C_{6} can join with other fullerenes to create more fullerenes.

=== In other sciences ===
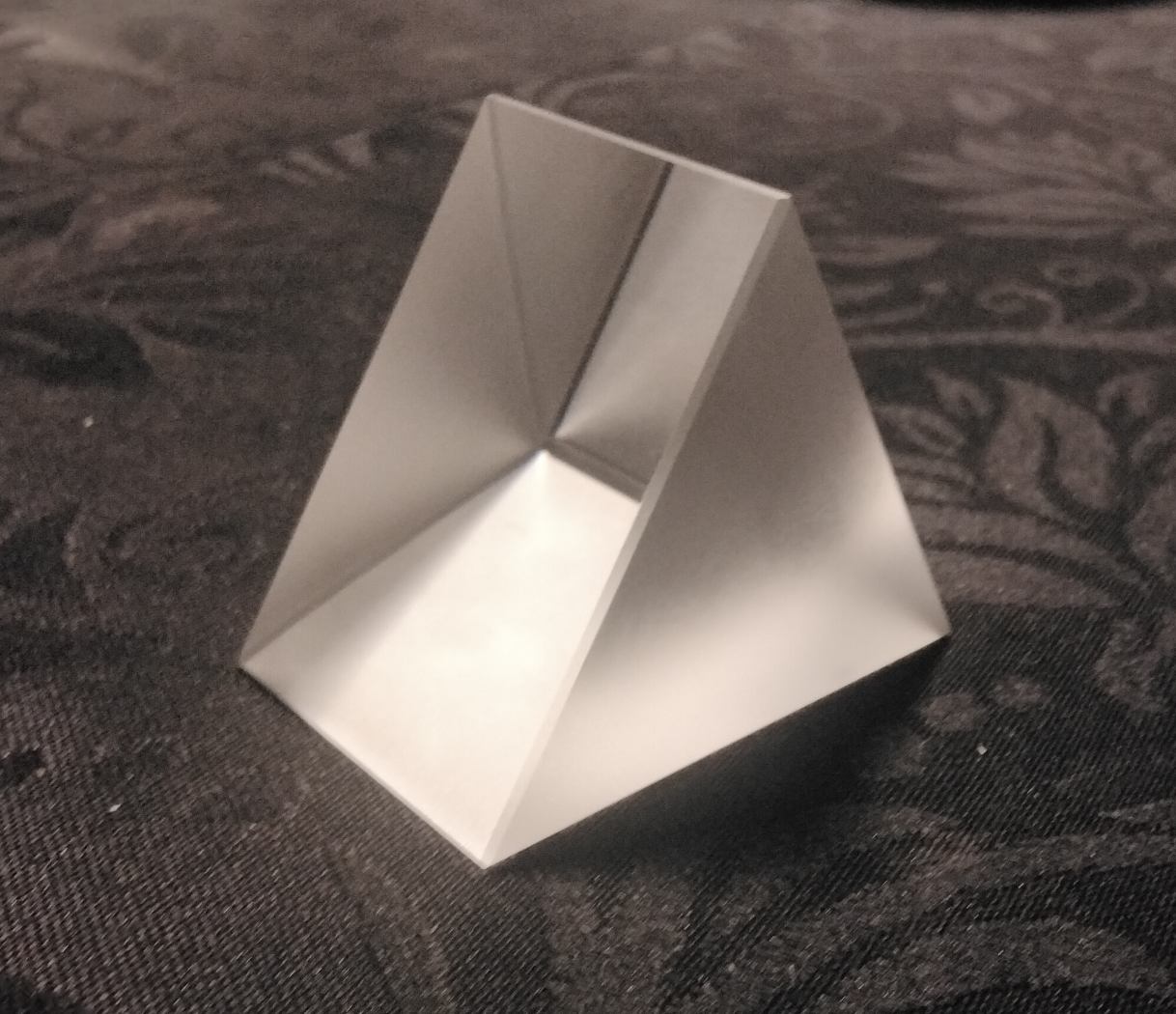
Triangular prism as an optical object

A triangular prism is commonly designed as a transparent optical object to disperse light.

A triangular prism is used as an object in the study of fluid dynamics, particularly in the angular flow induced vibration. The study is to observe the motion of a prism with equilateral triangular bases interact with an external fluid flow, produced by, or the motion producing, periodic irregularities on the flow. Researchers studied that such a solid is "unique" when oscillating about fixed point located upstream and downstream of the prism.

== Related figures ==
=== Honeycomb and tiling ===
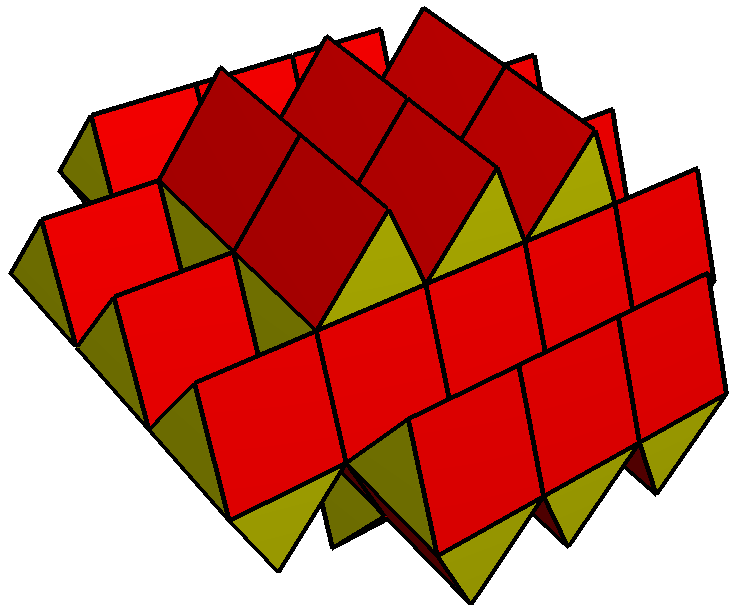
Two triangular prisms where the square face of one is attached quarter-turn produce a gyrobifastigium, which tiles a gyrated triangular prismatic honeycomb

The quaquaversal tiling, made from the tiling of 30-60-90 right triangular prisms

The uniform triangular prism is a plesiohedron, a space-filling polyhedron that can be defined as the Voronoi cell of a symmetric Delone set in order to create a honeycomb. The triangular prismatic honeycomb is an example where triangular prisms are the only prototiles. The other honeycombs with a cell being triangular prism and other polyhedra are gyroelongated alternated cubic honeycomb (with regular octahedra and tetrahedra), elongated alternated cubic honeycomb (with regular octahedra and tetrahedra), snub square prismatic honeycomb, triangular-hexagonal prismatic honeycomb, truncated hexagonal prismatic honeycomb, rhombitriangular-hexagonal prismatic honeycomb, snub triangular-hexagonal prismatic honeycomb, elongated triangular prismatic honeycomb.

John Horton Conway and Charles Radin in 1998 introduced the quaquaversal tiling, a three-dimensional non-periodic tiling. The prototiles are the 30-60-90 right triangular prisms, some of which are rotated π/3 and the others are rotated π/2 in a perpendicular direction.

=== In the construction of polyhedra ===
The triaugmented triangular prism

Beyond the triangular bipyramid as its dual polyhedron, many other polyhedra are related to the triangular prism. A Johnson solid is a convex polyhedron with regular faces, and this definition sometimes omits uniform polyhedra such as Archimedean solids, Catalan solids, prisms, and antiprisms. There are six Johnson solids with their construction involving the triangular prism:

- The elongated triangular pyramid and the elongated triangular bipyramid are made by attaching tetrahedron onto the base of a triangular prism.
- The augmented triangular prism, the biaugmented triangular prism, and the triaugmented triangular prism are constructed by attaching equilateral square pyramids onto the square face of the prism.
- The gyrobifastigium is constructed by attaching a triangular prism quarter-turn along to any square face of another one. It can tile a space of gyrated triangular prismatic honeycomb.

A right triangular prism with cutting off its part at an oblique angle

One can cut the part of a triangular prism at an oblique angle. The result has two bases that are not parallel, such that every distance between those bases has a different edge length. If the edges connecting bases are perpendicular to one of its bases, this prism can have a version of a right triangular prism. Given that A is the area of the triangular prism's base, and the three heights h_{1}, h_{2}, and h_{3}, its volume can be determined in the following formula:
$$V = \frac{A (h_1 + h_2 + h_3)}{3}.$$

The Schönhardt polyhedron

The Schönhardt polyhedron is another polyhedron constructed from a triangular prism with equilateral triangle bases. This way, one of its bases rotates around the prism's centerline and breaks the square faces into skew polygons. Each square face can be re-triangulated with two triangles to form a non-convex dihedral angle. As a result, the Schönhardt polyhedron cannot be triangulated by a partition into tetrahedra. It is also that the Schönhardt polyhedron has no internal diagonals. It is named after German mathematician Erich Schönhardt, who described it in 1928, although artist Karlis Johansons exhibited the related structure in 1921.

The triangular prism can be rectified from the convex hull of its midpoints' edges. The resulting construction yields three square faces on the same planes as the square faces of the prism, two equilateral triangle faces on the planes of the triangular ends of the prism, and six more isosceles triangle faces. By giving rise to a graph, its dual forms another convex polyhedron called Herschel enneahedron.

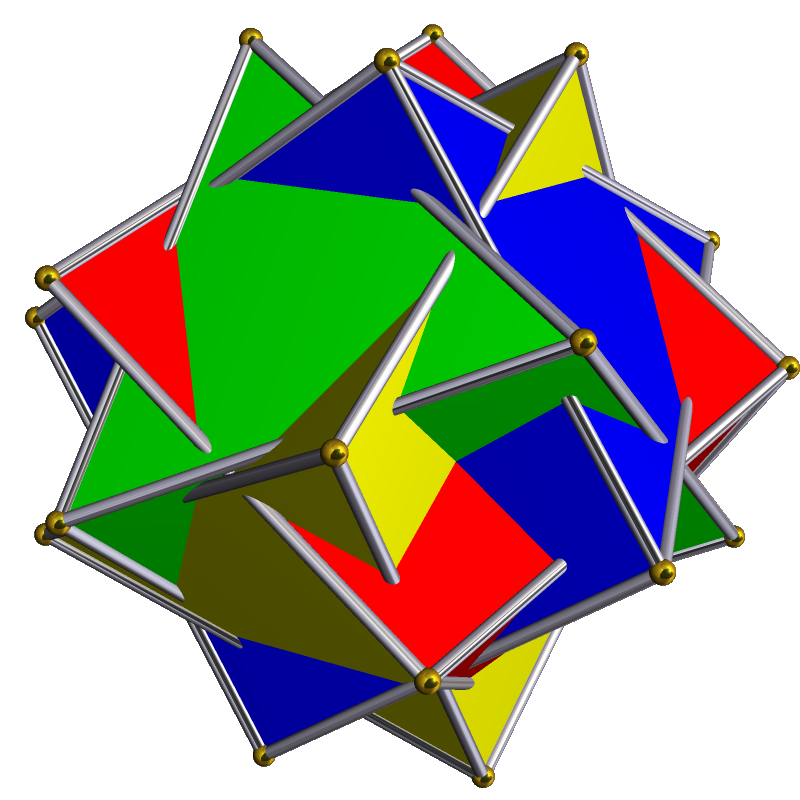
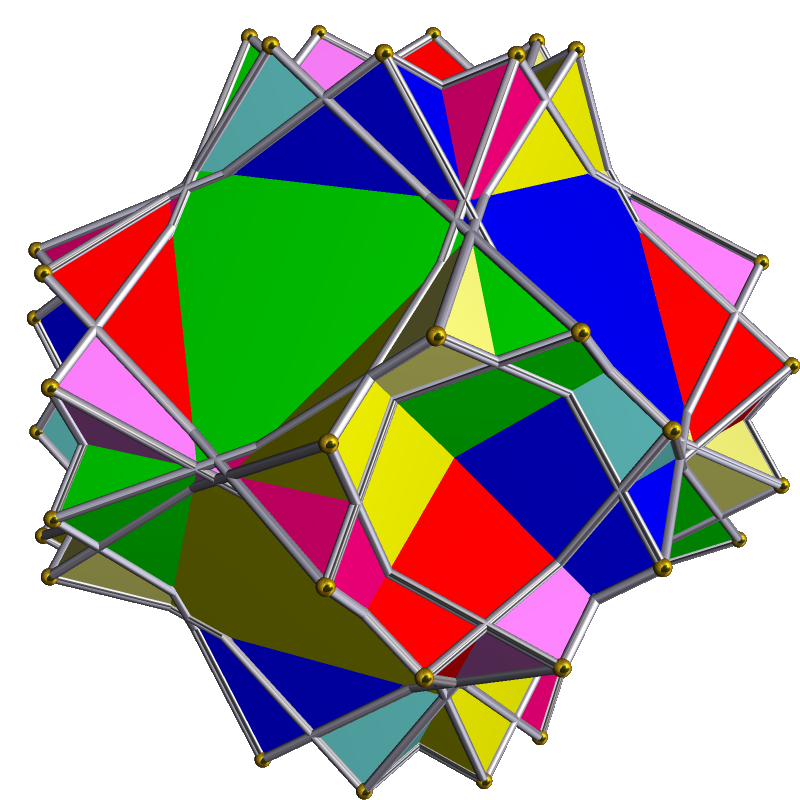
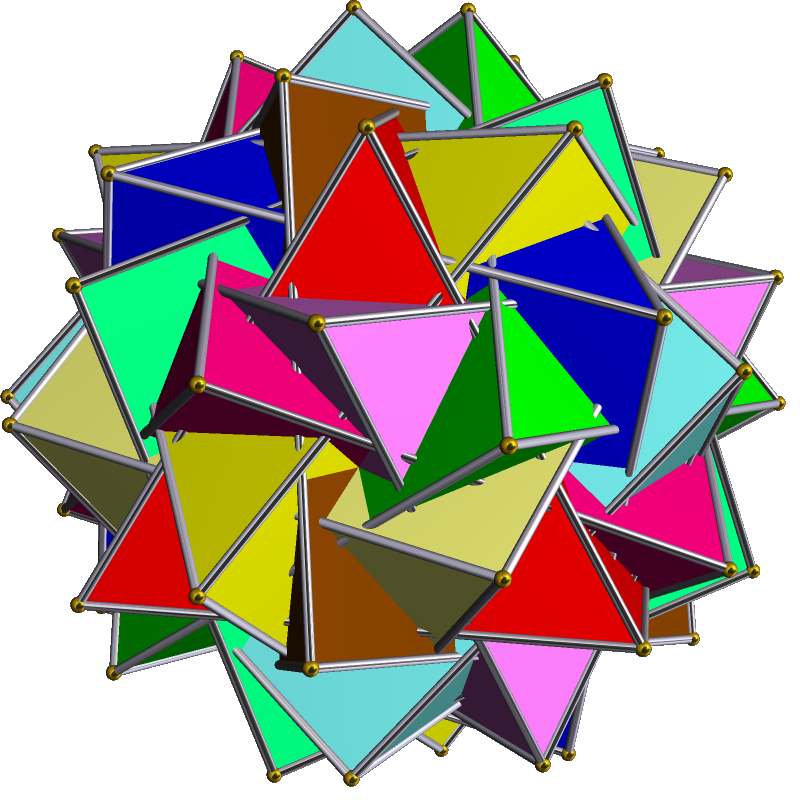
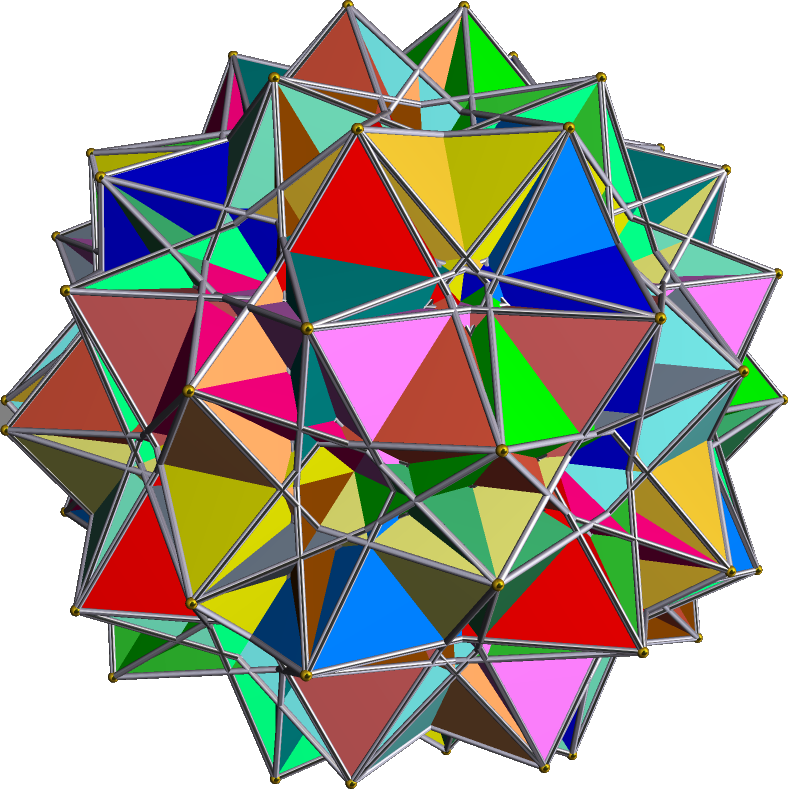
The compound of triangular prisms

The number of triangular prisms can be composed by sharing a common center. Four uniform compounds of triangular prisms, they are compound of four triangular prisms, compound of eight triangular prisms, compound of ten triangular prisms, compound of twenty triangular prisms.

=== Polytopes ===
The triangular prism is first in a dimensional series of semiregular polytopes. Each progressive uniform polytope is constructed vertex figure of the previous polytope. Thorold Gosset identified this series in 1900 as containing all regular polytope facets, containing all simplexes and orthoplexes (equilateral triangles and squares in the case of the triangular prism). In Coxeter's notation the triangular prism is given the symbol −1_{21}.

k_{21} figures in n dimensions
Space	Finite						Euclidean	Hyperbolic
E_{n}	3	4	5	6	7	8	9	10
Coxeter group	E_{3} = A_{2} A_{1}	E_{4} = A_{4}	E_{5} = D_{5}	E_{6}	E_{7}	E_{8}	E_{9} = Ẽ_{{8}} = E_{8}^{+}	E_{10} = T̅_{8} = E_{8}^{++}
Coxeter diagram								
Symmetry	[3^{−1,2,1}]	[3^{0,2,1}]	[3^{1,2,1}]	[3^{2,2,1}]	[3^{3,2,1}]	[3^{4,2,1}]	[3^{5,2,1}]	[3^{6,2,1}]
Order	12	120	1,920	51,840	2,903,040	696,729,600	∞	
Graph							-	-
Name	−1_{21}	0_{21}	1_{21}	2_{21}	3_{21}	4_{21}	5_{21}	6_{21}
