= Pinwheel tiling =

Non-periodic tiling in geometry

In geometry, pinwheel tilings are non-periodic tilings defined by Charles Radin and based on a construction due to John Conway. They are the first known non-periodic tilings to each have the property that their tiles appear in infinitely many orientations.

== Definition ==
Conway's triangle decomposition into smaller similar triangles.

Let $T$ be the right triangle with side length $1$, $2$ and $\sqrt{5}$. Conway noticed that $T$ can be divided in five isometric copies of its image by the dilation of factor $1/\sqrt{5}$. There are multiple ways of performing this subdivision; in the subdivision used for the pinwheel tiling, four copies of $T$ meet at the midpoint of the middle side of $T$, and the central copy has no sides parallel to the sides of $T$.

The increasing sequence of triangles which defines Conway's tiling of the plane.

A pinwheel tiling: tiles can be grouped in sets of five (thick lines) to form a new pinwheel tiling (up to rescaling)

The pinwheel tiling is obtained by repeatedly inflating $T$ by a factor of $\sqrt{5}$ and then subdividing each tile in this manner. Conversely, the tiles of the pinwheel tiling can be grouped into groups of five that form a larger pinwheel tiling. In this tiling, isometric copies of $T$ appear in infinitely many orientations because the small angle of $T$ by which its central copy is rotated, $\arctan\frac{1}{2}$, is not a rational multiple of $\pi$. Radin found a collection of five prototiles, each of which is a marking of $T$, so that the matching rules on these tiles and their reflections enforce the pinwheel tiling. All of the vertices have rational coordinates, and tile orientations are uniformly distributed around the circle.

== Generalizations ==
Radin and Conway proposed a three-dimensional analogue which was dubbed the quaquaversal tiling. There are other variants and generalizations of the original idea.

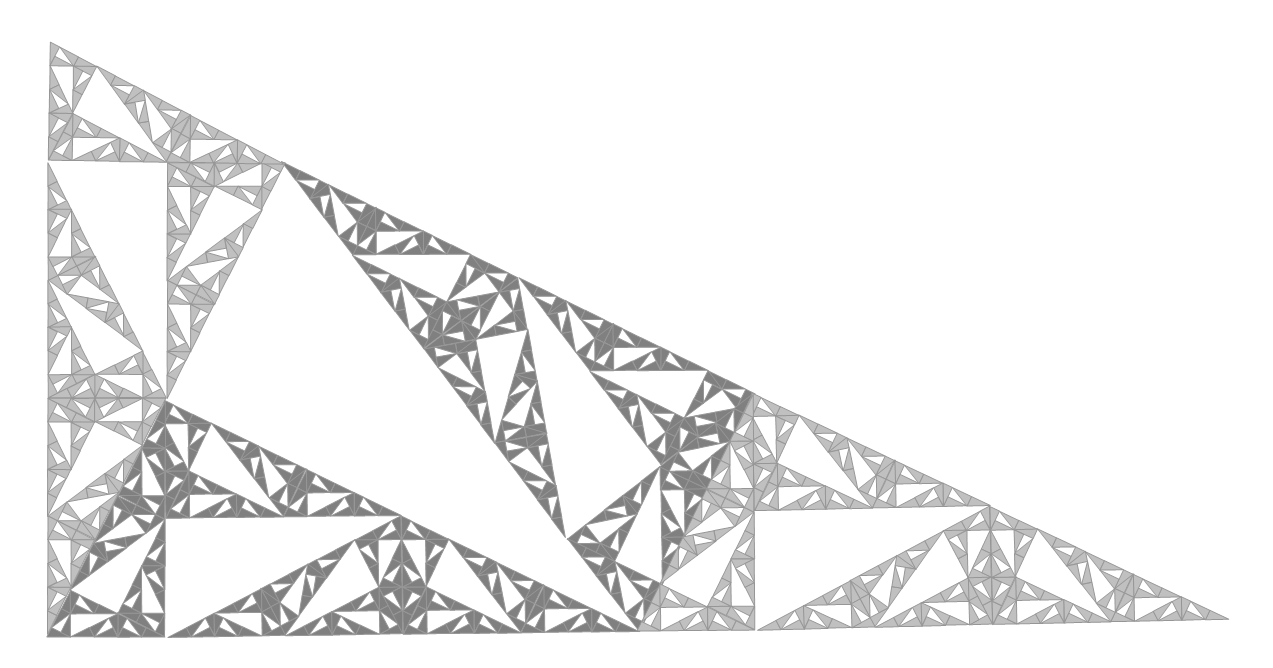
Pinwheel fractal

One gets a fractal by iteratively dividing $T$ in five isometric copies, following the Conway construction, and discarding the middle triangle (ad infinitum). This "pinwheel fractal" has Hausdorff dimension $d = \frac{\ln 4}{\ln \sqrt 5} = \log_5(16) \approx 1.7227$.

== Use in architecture ==
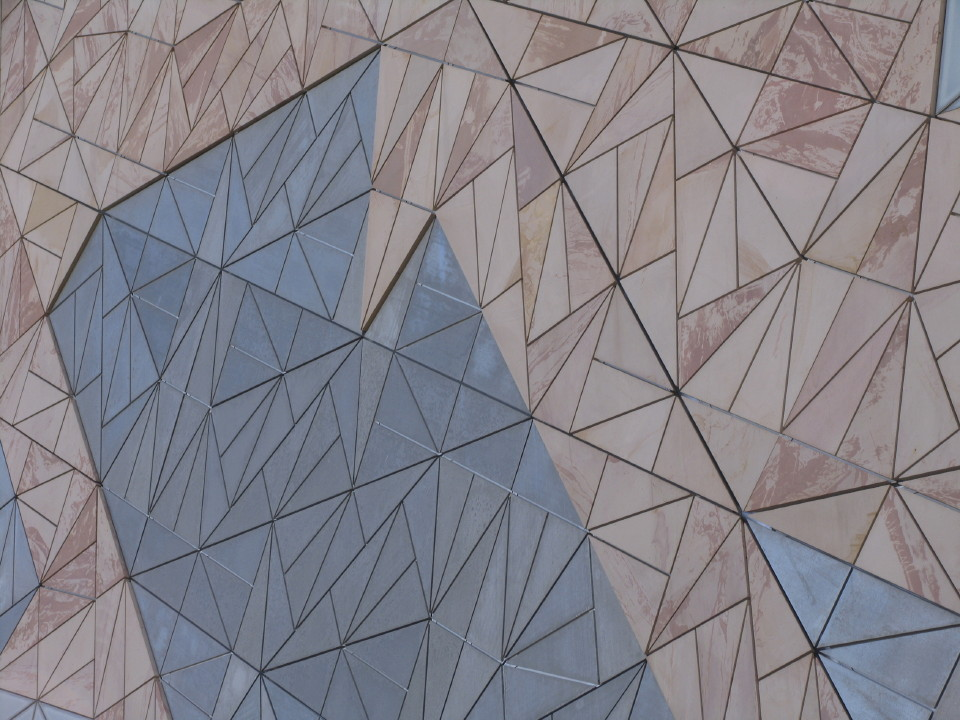
Federation Square's sandstone façade

Federation Square, a building complex in Melbourne, Australia, features the pinwheel tiling. In the project, the tiling pattern is used to create the structural sub-framing for the facades, allowing for the facades to be fabricated off-site, in a factory and later erected to form the facades. The pinwheel tiling system was based on the single triangular element, composed of zinc, perforated zinc, sandstone or glass (known as a tile), which was joined to 4 other similar tiles on an aluminum frame, to form a "panel". Five panels were affixed to a galvanized steel frame, forming a "mega-panel", which were then hoisted onto support frames for the facade. The rotational positioning of the tiles gives the facades a more random, uncertain compositional quality, even though the process of its construction is based on pre-fabrication and repetition. The same pinwheel tiling system is used in the development of the structural frame and glazing for the "Atrium" at Federation Square, although in this instance, the pin-wheel grid has been made "3-dimensional" to form a portal frame structure.
