= Convex uniform honeycomb =

Spatial tiling of convex uniform polyhedra

The alternated cubic honeycomb is one of 28 space-filling uniform tessellations in Euclidean 3-space, composed of alternating yellow tetrahedra and red octahedra.

In geometry, a convex uniform honeycomb is a uniform tessellation which fills three-dimensional Euclidean space with non-overlapping convex uniform polyhedral cells.

Twenty-eight such honeycombs are known:

- the familiar cubic honeycomb and 7 truncations thereof;
- the alternated cubic honeycomb and 4 truncations thereof;
- 10 prismatic forms based on the uniform plane tilings (11 if including the cubic honeycomb);
- 5 modifications of some of the above by elongation and/or gyration.

They can be considered the three-dimensional analogue to the uniform tilings of the plane.

== History ==
- 1900: Thorold Gosset enumerated the list of semiregular convex polytopes with regular cells (Platonic solids) in his publication On the Regular and Semi-Regular Figures in Space of n Dimensions, including one regular cubic honeycomb, and two semiregular forms with tetrahedra and octahedra.
- 1905: Alfredo Andreini enumerated 25 of these tessellations.
- 1991: Norman Johnson's manuscript Uniform Polytopes identified the list of 28.
- 1994: Branko Grünbaum, in his paper Uniform tilings of 3-space, also independently enumerated all 28, after discovering errors in Andreini's publication. He found the 1905 paper, which listed 25, had 1 wrong, and 4 being missing. Grünbaum states in this paper that Norman Johnson deserves priority for achieving the same enumeration in 1991. He also mentions that I. Alexeyev of Russia had contacted him regarding a putative enumeration of these forms, but that Grünbaum was unable to verify this at the time.
- 2006: George Olshevsky, in his manuscript Uniform Panoploid Tetracombs, along with repeating the derived list of 11 convex uniform tilings, and 28 convex uniform honeycombs, expands a further derived list of 143 convex uniform tetracombs (Honeycombs of uniform 4-polytopes in 4-space).

Only 14 of the convex uniform polyhedra appear in these patterns:

- three of the five Platonic solids (the tetrahedron, cube, and octahedron),
- six of the thirteen Archimedean solids (the ones with reflective tetrahedral or octahedral symmetry), and
- five of the infinite family of prisms (the 3-, 4-, 6-, 8-, and 12-gonal ones; the 4-gonal prism duplicates the cube).

The icosahedron, snub cube, and square antiprism appear in some alternations, but those honeycombs cannot be realised with all edges unit length.

=== Names ===
This set can be called the regular and semiregular honeycombs. It has been called the Archimedean honeycombs by analogy with the convex uniform (non-regular) polyhedra, commonly called Archimedean solids. Recently Conway has suggested naming the set as the Architectonic tessellations and the dual honeycombs as the Catoptric tessellations.

The individual honeycombs are listed with names given to them by Norman Johnson. (Some of the terms used below are defined in Uniform 4-polytope#Geometric derivations for 46 nonprismatic Wythoffian uniform 4-polytopes)

For cross-referencing, they are given with list indices from Andreini (1-22), Williams(1–2,9-19), Johnson (11–19, 21–25, 31–34, 41–49, 51–52, 61–65), and Grünbaum(1-28). Coxeter uses δ_{4} for a cubic honeycomb, hδ_{4} for an alternated cubic honeycomb, qδ_{4} for a quarter cubic honeycomb, with subscripts for other forms based on the ring patterns of the Coxeter diagram.

== Compact Euclidean uniform tessellations (by their infinite Coxeter group families) ==
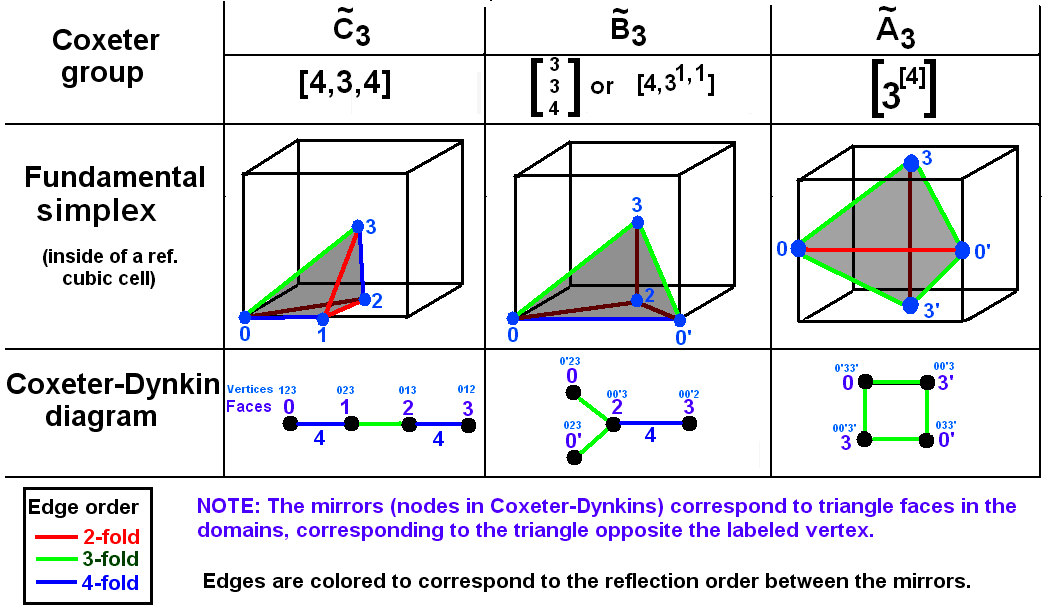
Fundamental domains in a cubic element of three groups.

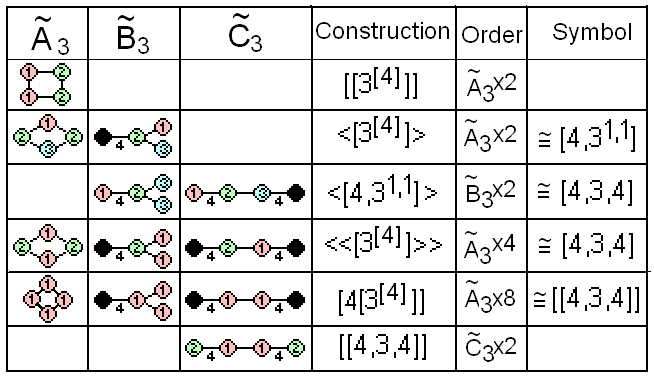
Family correspondences

The fundamental infinite Coxeter groups for 3-space are:

1. The ${\tilde{C}}_3$, [4,3,4], cubic, (8 unique forms plus one alternation)
2. The ${\tilde{B}}_3$, [4,3^{1,1}], alternated cubic, (11 forms, 3 new)
3. The ${\tilde{A}}_3$ cyclic group, [(3,3,3,3)] or [3^{[4]}], (5 forms, one new)

There is a correspondence between all three families. Removing one mirror from ${\tilde{C}}_3$ produces ${\tilde{B}}_3$, and removing one mirror from ${\tilde{B}}_3$ produces ${\tilde{A}}_3$. This allows multiple constructions of the same honeycombs. If cells are colored based on unique positions within each Wythoff construction, these different symmetries can be shown.

In addition there are 5 special honeycombs which don't have pure reflectional symmetry and are constructed from reflectional forms with elongation and gyration operations.

The total unique honeycombs above are 18.

The prismatic stacks from infinite Coxeter groups for 3-space are:

1. The ${\tilde{C}}_2$×${\tilde{I}}_1$, [4,4,2,∞] prismatic group, (2 new forms)
2. The ${\tilde{G}}_2$×${\tilde{I}}_1$, [6,3,2,∞] prismatic group, (7 unique forms)
3. The ${\tilde{A}}_2$×${\tilde{I}}_1$, [(3,3,3),2,∞] prismatic group, (No new forms)
4. The ${\tilde{I}}_1$×${\tilde{I}}_1$×${\tilde{I}}_1$, [∞,2,∞,2,∞] prismatic group, (These all become a cubic honeycomb)

In addition there is one special elongated form of the triangular prismatic honeycomb.

The total unique prismatic honeycombs above (excluding the cubic counted previously) are 10.

Combining these counts, 18 and 10 gives us the total 28 uniform honeycombs.

=== The C̃_{3}, [4,3,4] group (cubic) ===
The regular cubic honeycomb, represented by Schläfli symbol {4,3,4}, offers seven unique derived uniform honeycombs via truncation operations. (One redundant form, the runcinated cubic honeycomb, is included for completeness though identical to the cubic honeycomb.) The reflectional symmetry is the affine Coxeter group [4,3,4]. There are four index 2 subgroups that generate alternations: [1^{+},4,3,4], [(4,3,4,2^{+})], [4,3^{+},4], and [4,3,4]^{+}, with the first two generated repeated forms, and the last two are nonuniform.

C3 honeycombs
Space group	Fibrifold	Extended symmetry	Extended diagram	Order	Honeycombs
Pm3̅m (221)	4^{−}:2	[4,3,4]		×1	_{1}, _{2}, _{3}, _{4}, _{5}, _{6}
Fm3̅m (225)	2^{−}:2	[1^{+},4,3,4] ↔ [4,3^{1,1}]	↔	Half	_{7}, _{11}, _{12}, _{13}
I4̅3m (217)	4^{o}:2	[[(4,3,4,2^{+})]]		Half × 2	_{(7)},
Fd3̅m (227)	2^{+}:2	[[1^{+},4,3,4,1^{+}]] ↔ [[3^{[4]}]]	↔	Quarter × 2	_{10},
Im3̅m (229)	8^{o}:2	[[4,3,4]]		×2	_{(1)}, _{8}, _{9}

[4,3,4], space group Pm3̅m (221)
Reference Indices	Honeycomb name Coxeter diagram and Schläfli symbol	Cell counts/vertex and positions in cubic honeycomb						Frames (Perspective)	Vertex figure	Dual cell
Reference Indices	Honeycomb name Coxeter diagram and Schläfli symbol	(0)	(1)	(2)	(3)	Alt	Solids (Partial)	Frames (Perspective)	Vertex figure	Dual cell
J_{11,15} A_{1} W_{1} G_{22} δ_{4}	cubic (chon) t_{0}{4,3,4} {4,3,4}				(8) (4.4.4)				octahedron	Cube,
J_{12,32} A_{15} W_{14} G_{7} O_{1}	rectified cubic (rich) t_{1}{4,3,4} r{4,3,4}	(2) (3.3.3.3)			(4) (3.4.3.4)				cuboid	Square bipyramid
J_{13} A_{14} W_{15} G_{8} t_{1}δ_{4} O_{15}	truncated cubic (tich) t_{0,1}{4,3,4} t{4,3,4}	(1) (3.3.3.3)			(4) (3.8.8)				square pyramid	Isosceles square pyramid
J_{14} A_{17} W_{12} G_{9} t_{0,2}δ_{4} O_{14}	cantellated cubic (srich) t_{0,2}{4,3,4} rr{4,3,4}	(1) (3.4.3.4)	(2) (4.4.4)		(2) (3.4.4.4)				oblique triangular prism	Triangular bipyramid
J_{17} A_{18} W_{13} G_{25} t_{0,1,2}δ_{4} O_{17}	cantitruncated cubic (grich) t_{0,1,2}{4,3,4} tr{4,3,4}	(1) (4.6.6)	(1) (4.4.4)		(2) (4.6.8)				irregular tetrahedron	Triangular pyramidille
J_{18} A_{19} W_{19} G_{20} t_{0,1,3}δ_{4} O_{19}	runcitruncated cubic (prich) t_{0,1,3}{4,3,4}	(1) (3.4.4.4)	(1) (4.4.4)	(2) (4.4.8)	(1) (3.8.8)				oblique trapezoidal pyramid	Square quarter pyramidille
J_{21,31,51} A_{2} W_{9} G_{1} hδ_{4} O_{21}	alternated cubic (octet) h{4,3,4}				(8) (3.3.3)	(6) (3.3.3.3)			cuboctahedron	Dodecahedrille
J_{22,34} A_{21} W_{17} G_{10} h_{2}δ_{4} O_{25}	Cantic cubic (tatoh) ↔	(1) (3.4.3.4)			(2) (3.6.6)	(2) (4.6.6)			rectangular pyramid	Half oblate octahedrille
J_{23} A_{16} W_{11} G_{5} h_{3}δ_{4} O_{26}	Runcic cubic (sratoh) ↔	(1) (4.4.4)			(1) (3.3.3)	(3) (3.4.4.4)			tapered triangular prism	Quarter cubille
J_{24} A_{20} W_{16} G_{21} h_{2,3}δ_{4} O_{28}	Runcicantic cubic (gratoh) ↔	(1) (3.8.8)			(1) (3.6.6)	(2) (4.6.8)			Irregular tetrahedron	Half pyramidille
Nonuniform_{b}	snub rectified cubic (serch) sr{4,3,4}	(1) (3.3.3.3.3)	(1) (3.3.3)		(2) (3.3.3.3.4)	(4) (3.3.3)			Irr. tridiminished icosahedron	
Nonuniform	Cantic snub cubic (casch) 2s_{0}{4,3,4}	(1) (3.3.3.3.3)			(2) (3.4.4.4)	(3) (3.4.4)				
Nonuniform	Runcicantic snub cubic (rusch)	(1) (3.4.3.4)	(2) (4.4.4)	(1) (3.3.3)	(1) (3.6.6)	(3) Tricup				
Nonuniform	Runcic cantitruncated cubic (esch) sr_{3}{4,3,4}	(1) (3.3.3.3.4)	(1) (4.4.4)	(1) (4.4.4)	(1) (3.4.4.4)	(3) (3.4.4)				

[[4,3,4]] honeycombs, space group Im3̅m (229)
Reference Indices	Honeycomb name Coxeter diagram and Schläfli symbol	Cell counts/vertex and positions in cubic honeycomb			Solids (Partial)	Frames (Perspective)	Vertex figure	Dual cell
Reference Indices	Honeycomb name Coxeter diagram and Schläfli symbol	(0,3)	(1,2)	Alt	Solids (Partial)	Frames (Perspective)	Vertex figure	Dual cell
J_{11,15} A_{1} W_{1} G_{22} δ_{4} O_{1}	runcinated cubic (same as regular cubic) (chon) t_{0,3}{4,3,4}	(2) (4.4.4)	(6) (4.4.4)				octahedron	Cube
J_{16} A_{3} W_{2} G_{28} t_{1,2}δ_{4} O_{16}	bitruncated cubic (batch) t_{1,2}{4,3,4} 2t{4,3,4}	(4) (4.6.6)					(disphenoid)	Oblate tetrahedrille
J_{19} A_{22} W_{18} G_{27} t_{0,1,2,3}δ_{4} O_{20}	omnitruncated cubic (gippich) t_{0,1,2,3}{4,3,4}	(2) (4.6.8)	(2) (4.4.8)				irregular tetrahedron	Eighth pyramidille
J_{21,31,51} A_{2} W_{9} G_{1} hδ_{4} O_{27}	Quarter cubic honeycomb (cytatoh) ht_{0}ht_{3}{4,3,4}	(2) (3.3.3)	(6) (3.6.6)				elongated triangular antiprism	Oblate cubille
J_{21,31,51} A_{2} W_{9} G_{1} hδ_{4} O_{21}	Alternated runcinated cubic (octet) (same as alternated cubic) ht_{0,3}{4,3,4}	(2) (3.3.3)	(6) (3.3.3)	(6) (3.3.3.3)			cuboctahedron	
Nonuniform	Biorthosnub cubic honeycomb (gabreth) 2s_{0,3}{(4,2,4,3)}	(2) (4.6.6)	(2) (4.4.4)	(2) (4.4.6)				
Nonuniform_{a}	Alternated bitruncated cubic (bisch) h2t{4,3,4}	(4) (3.3.3.3.3)		(4) (3.3.3)				
Nonuniform	Cantic bisnub cubic (cabisch) 2s_{0,3}{4,3,4}	(2) (3.4.4.4)	(2) (4.4.4)	(2) (4.4.4)				
Nonuniform_{c}	Alternated omnitruncated cubic (snich) ht_{0,1,2,3}{4,3,4}	(2) (3.3.3.3.4)	(2) (3.3.3.4)	(4) (3.3.3)				

=== B̃_{3}, [4,3^{1,1}] group ===
The ${\tilde{B}}_3$, [4,3] group offers 11 derived forms via truncation operations, four being unique uniform honeycombs. There are 3 index 2 subgroups that generate alternations: [1^{+},4,3^{1,1}], [4,(3^{1,1})^{+}], and [4,3^{1,1}]^{+}. The first generates repeated honeycomb, and the last two are nonuniform but included for completeness.

The honeycombs from this group are called alternated cubic because the first form can be seen as a cubic honeycomb with alternate vertices removed, reducing cubic cells to tetrahedra and creating octahedron cells in the gaps.

Nodes are indexed left to right as 0,1,0',3 with 0' being below and interchangeable with 0. The alternate cubic names given are based on this ordering.

B3 honeycombs
Space group	Fibrifold	Extended symmetry	Extended diagram	Order	Honeycombs
Fm3̅m (225)	2^{−}:2	[4,3^{1,1}] ↔ [4,3,4,1^{+}]	↔	×1	_{1}, _{2}, _{3}, _{4}
Fm3̅m (225)	2^{−}:2	<[1^{+},4,3^{1,1}]> ↔ <[3^{[4]}]>	↔	×2	_{(1)}, _{(3)}
Pm3̅m (221)	4^{−}:2	<[4,3^{1,1}]>		×2	_{5}, _{6}, _{7}, _{(6)}, _{9}, _{10}, _{11}

[4,3^{1,1}] uniform honeycombs, space group Fm3̅m (225)
Referenced indices	Honeycomb name Coxeter diagrams	Cells by location (and count around each vertex)				Solids (Partial)	Frames (Perspective)	vertex figure
Referenced indices	Honeycomb name Coxeter diagrams	(0)	(1)	(0')	(3)	Solids (Partial)	Frames (Perspective)	vertex figure
J_{21,31,51} A_{2} W_{9} G_{1} hδ_{4} O_{21}	Alternated cubic (octet) ↔			(6) (3.3.3.3)	(8) (3.3.3)			cuboctahedron
J_{22,34} A_{21} W_{17} G_{10} h_{2}δ_{4} O_{25}	Cantic cubic (tatoh) ↔	(1) (3.4.3.4)		(2) (4.6.6)	(2) (3.6.6)			rectangular pyramid
J_{23} A_{16} W_{11} G_{5} h_{3}δ_{4} O_{26}	Runcic cubic (sratoh) ↔	(1) cube		(3) (3.4.4.4)	(1) (3.3.3)			tapered triangular prism
J_{24} A_{20} W_{16} G_{21} h_{2,3}δ_{4} O_{28}	Runcicantic cubic (gratoh) ↔	(1) (3.8.8)		(2) (4.6.8)	(1) (3.6.6)			Irregular tetrahedron

<[4,3^{1,1}]> uniform honeycombs, space group Pm3̅m (221)
Referenced indices	Honeycomb name Coxeter diagrams ↔	Cells by location (and count around each vertex)				Solids (Partial)	Frames (Perspective)	vertex figure
Referenced indices	Honeycomb name Coxeter diagrams ↔	(0,0')	(1)	(3)	Alt	Solids (Partial)	Frames (Perspective)	vertex figure
J_{11,15} A_{1} W_{1} G_{22} δ_{4} O_{1}	Cubic (chon) ↔	(8) (4.4.4)						octahedron
J_{12,32} A_{15} W_{14} G_{7} t_{1}δ_{4} O_{15}	Rectified cubic (rich) ↔	(4) (3.4.3.4)		(2) (3.3.3.3)				cuboid
J_{12,32} A_{15} W_{14} G_{7} t_{1}δ_{4} O_{15}	Rectified cubic (rich) ↔	(2) (3.3.3.3)		(4) (3.4.3.4)				cuboid
J_{13} A_{14} W_{15} G_{8} t_{0,1}δ_{4} O_{14}	Truncated cubic (tich) ↔	(4) (3.8.8)		(1) (3.3.3.3)				square pyramid
J_{14} A_{17} W_{12} G_{9} t_{0,2}δ_{4} O_{17}	Cantellated cubic (srich) ↔	(2) (3.4.4.4)	(2) (4.4.4)	(1) (3.4.3.4)				obilique triangular prism
J_{16} A_{3} W_{2} G_{28} t_{0,2}δ_{4} O_{16}	Bitruncated cubic (batch) ↔	(2) (4.6.6)		(2) (4.6.6)				isosceles tetrahedron
J_{17} A_{18} W_{13} G_{25} t_{0,1,2}δ_{4} O_{18}	Cantitruncated cubic (grich) ↔	(2) (4.6.8)	(1) (4.4.4)	(1) (4.6.6)				irregular tetrahedron
J_{21,31,51} A_{2} W_{9} G_{1} hδ_{4} O_{21}	Alternated cubic (octet) ↔	(8) (3.3.3)			(6) (3.3.3.3)			cuboctahedron
J_{22,34} A_{21} W_{17} G_{10} h_{2}δ_{4} O_{25}	Cantic cubic (tatoh) ↔	(2) (3.6.6)		(1) (3.4.3.4)	(2) (4.6.6)			rectangular pyramid
Nonuniform_{a}	Alternated bitruncated cubic (bisch) ↔	(2) (3.3.3.3.3)		(2) (3.3.3.3.3)	(4) (3.3.3)			
Nonuniform_{b}	Alternated cantitruncated cubic (serch) ↔	(2) (3.3.3.3.4)	(1) (3.3.3)	(1) (3.3.3.3.3)	(4) (3.3.3)			Irr. tridiminished icosahedron

=== Ã_{3}, [3^{[4]}] group ===
There are 5 forms constructed from the ${\tilde{A}}_3$, [3^{[4]}] Coxeter group, of which only the quarter cubic honeycomb is unique. There is one index 2 subgroup [3^{[4]}]^{+} which generates the snub form, which is not uniform, but included for completeness.

A3 honeycombs
Space group	Fibrifold	Square symmetry	Extended symmetry	Extended diagram	Extended group	Honeycomb diagrams
F4̅3m (216)	1^{o}:2	a1	[3^{[4]}]		${\tilde{A}}_3$	(None)
Fm3̅m (225)	2^{−}:2	d2	<[3^{[4]}]> ↔ [4,3^{1,1}]	↔	${\tilde{A}}_3$×2_{1} ↔ ${\tilde{B}}_3$	_{1}, _{2}
Fd3̅m (227)	2^{+}:2	g2	[[3^{[4]}]] or [2^{+}[3^{[4]}]]	↔	${\tilde{A}}_3$×2_{2}	_{3}
Pm3̅m (221)	4^{−}:2	d4	<2[3^{[4]}]> ↔ [4,3,4]	↔	${\tilde{A}}_3$×4_{1} ↔ ${\tilde{C}}_3$	_{4}
I3̅ (204)	8^{−o}	r8	[4[3^{[4]}]]^{+} ↔ [[4,3^{+},4]]	↔	½${\tilde{A}}_3$×8 ↔ ½${\tilde{C}}_3$×2	_{(*)}
Im3̅m (229)	8^{o}:2	r8	[4[3^{[4]}]] ↔ [[4,3,4]]	↔	${\tilde{A}}_3$×8 ↔ ${\tilde{C}}_3$×2	_{5}

[[3^{[4]}]] uniform honeycombs, space group Fd3̅m (227)
Referenced indices	Honeycomb name Coxeter diagrams	Cells by location (and count around each vertex)		Solids (Partial)	Frames (Perspective)	vertex figure
Referenced indices	Honeycomb name Coxeter diagrams	(0,1)	(2,3)	Solids (Partial)	Frames (Perspective)	vertex figure
J_{25,33} A_{13} W_{10} G_{6} qδ_{4} O_{27}	quarter cubic (cytatoh) ↔ q{4,3,4}	(2) (3.3.3)	(6) (3.6.6)			triangular antiprism

<[3^{[4]}]> ↔ [4,3^{1,1}] uniform honeycombs, space group Fm3̅m (225)
Referenced indices	Honeycomb name Coxeter diagrams ↔	Cells by location (and count around each vertex)			Solids (Partial)	Frames (Perspective)	vertex figure
Referenced indices	Honeycomb name Coxeter diagrams ↔	0	(1,3)	2	Solids (Partial)	Frames (Perspective)	vertex figure
J_{21,31,51} A_{2} W_{9} G_{1} hδ_{4} O_{21}	alternated cubic (octet) ↔ ↔ h{4,3,4}		(8) (3.3.3)	(6) (3.3.3.3)			cuboctahedron
J_{22,34} A_{21} W_{17} G_{10} h_{2}δ_{4} O_{25}	cantic cubic (tatoh) ↔ ↔ h_{2}{4,3,4}	(2) (3.6.6)	(1) (3.4.3.4)	(2) (4.6.6)			Rectangular pyramid

[2[3^{[4]}]] ↔ [4,3,4] uniform honeycombs, space group Pm3̅m (221)
Referenced indices	Honeycomb name Coxeter diagrams ↔	Cells by location (and count around each vertex)		Solids (Partial)	Frames (Perspective)	vertex figure
Referenced indices	Honeycomb name Coxeter diagrams ↔	(0,2)	(1,3)	Solids (Partial)	Frames (Perspective)	vertex figure
J_{12,32} A_{15} W_{14} G_{7} t_{1}δ_{4} O_{1}	rectified cubic (rich) ↔ ↔ ↔ r{4,3,4}	(2) (3.4.3.4)	(1) (3.3.3.3)			cuboid

[4[3^{[4]}]] ↔ [[4,3,4]] uniform honeycombs, space group Im3̅m (229)
Referenced indices	Honeycomb name Coxeter diagrams ↔ ↔	Cells by location (and count around each vertex)		Solids (Partial)	Frames (Perspective)	vertex figure
Referenced indices	Honeycomb name Coxeter diagrams ↔ ↔	(0,1,2,3)	Alt	Solids (Partial)	Frames (Perspective)	vertex figure
J_{16} A_{3} W_{2} G_{28} t_{1,2}δ_{4} O_{16}	bitruncated cubic (batch) ↔ ↔ 2t{4,3,4}	(4) (4.6.6)				isosceles tetrahedron
Nonuniform_{a}	Alternated cantitruncated cubic (bisch) ↔ ↔ h2t{4,3,4}	(4) (3.3.3.3.3)	(4) (3.3.3)			

=== Nonwythoffian forms (gyrated and elongated) ===
Three more uniform honeycombs are generated by breaking one or another of the above honeycombs where its faces form a continuous plane, then rotating alternate layers by 60 or 90 degrees (gyration) and/or inserting a layer of prisms (elongation).

The elongated and gyroelongated alternated cubic tilings have the same vertex figure, but are not alike. In the elongated form, each prism meets a tetrahedron at one triangular end and an octahedron at the other. In the gyroelongated form, prisms that meet tetrahedra at both ends alternate with prisms that meet octahedra at both ends.

The gyroelongated triangular prismatic tiling has the same vertex figure as one of the plain prismatic tilings; the two may be derived from the gyrated and plain triangular prismatic tilings, respectively, by inserting layers of cubes.

Referenced indices	symbol	Honeycomb name	cell types (# at each vertex)	Solids (Partial)	Frames (Perspective)	vertex figure
J_{52} A_{2'} G_{2} O_{22}	h{4,3,4}:g	gyrated alternated cubic (gytoh)	tetrahedron (8) octahedron (6)			triangular orthobicupola
J_{61} A_{?} G_{3} O_{24}	h{4,3,4}:ge	gyroelongated alternated cubic (gyetoh)	triangular prism (6) tetrahedron (4) octahedron (3)			
J_{62} A_{?} G_{4} O_{23}	h{4,3,4}:e	elongated alternated cubic (etoh)	triangular prism (6) tetrahedron (4) octahedron (3)			
J_{63} A_{?} G_{12} O_{12}	{3,6}:g × {∞}	gyrated triangular prismatic (gytoph)	triangular prism (12)			
J_{64} A_{?} G_{15} O_{13}	{3,6}:ge × {∞}	gyroelongated triangular prismatic (gyetaph)	triangular prism (6) cube (4)			

=== Prismatic stacks ===
Eleven prismatic tilings are obtained by stacking the eleven uniform plane tilings, shown below, in parallel layers. (One of these honeycombs is the cubic, shown above.) The vertex figure of each is an irregular bipyramid whose faces are isosceles triangles.

==== The C̃_{2}×Ĩ_{1}(∞), [4,4,2,∞], prismatic group ====
There are only 3 unique honeycombs from the square tiling, but all 6 tiling truncations are listed below for completeness, and tiling images are shown by colors corresponding to each form.

Indices	Coxeter-Dynkin and Schläfli symbols	Honeycomb name	Plane tiling	Solids (Partial)	Tiling
J_{11,15} A_{1} G_{22}	{4,4}×{∞}	Cubic (Square prismatic) (chon)	(4.4.4.4)		
J_{11,15} A_{1} G_{22}	r{4,4}×{∞}	Cubic (Square prismatic) (chon)	(4.4.4.4)		
J_{11,15} A_{1} G_{22}	rr{4,4}×{∞}	Cubic (Square prismatic) (chon)	(4.4.4.4)		
J_{45} A_{6} G_{24}	t{4,4}×{∞}	Truncated/Bitruncated square prismatic (tassiph)	(4.8.8)		
J_{45} A_{6} G_{24}	tr{4,4}×{∞}	Truncated/Bitruncated square prismatic (tassiph)	(4.8.8)		
J_{44} A_{11} G_{14}	sr{4,4}×{∞}	Snub square prismatic (sassiph)	(3.3.4.3.4)		
Nonuniform	ht_{0,1,2,3}{4,4,2,∞}				

==== The G̃_{2}xĨ_{1}(∞), [6,3,2,∞] prismatic group ====
Indices	Coxeter-Dynkin and Schläfli symbols	Honeycomb name	Plane tiling	Solids (Partial)	Tiling
J_{41} A_{4} G_{11}	{3,6} × {∞}	Triangular prismatic (tiph)	(3^{6})		
J_{42} A_{5} G_{26}	{6,3} × {∞}	Hexagonal prismatic (hiph)	(6^{3})		
J_{42} A_{5} G_{26}	t{3,6} × {∞}	Hexagonal prismatic (hiph)	(6^{3})		
J_{43} A_{8} G_{18}	r{6,3} × {∞}	Trihexagonal prismatic (thiph)	(3.6.3.6)		
J_{46} A_{7} G_{19}	t{6,3} × {∞}	Truncated hexagonal prismatic (thaph)	(3.12.12)		
J_{47} A_{9} G_{16}	rr{6,3} × {∞}	Rhombi-trihexagonal prismatic (srothaph)	(3.4.6.4)		
J_{48} A_{12} G_{17}	sr{6,3} × {∞}	Snub hexagonal prismatic (snathaph)	(3.3.3.3.6)		
J_{49} A_{10} G_{23}	tr{6,3} × {∞}	truncated trihexagonal prismatic (grothaph)	(4.6.12)		
J_{65} A_{11'} G_{13}	{3,6}:e × {∞}	elongated triangular prismatic (etoph)	(3.3.3.4.4)		
J_{52} A_{2'} G_{2}	h3t{3,6,2,∞}	gyrated tetrahedral-octahedral (gytoh)	(3^{6})		
J_{52} A_{2'} G_{2}	s2r{3,6,2,∞}	gyrated tetrahedral-octahedral (gytoh)	(3^{6})		
Nonuniform	ht_{0,1,2,3}{3,6,2,∞}				

=== Enumeration of Wythoff forms ===
All nonprismatic Wythoff constructions by Coxeter groups are given below, along with their alternations. Uniform solutions are indexed with Branko Grünbaum's listing. Green backgrounds are shown on repeated honeycombs, with the relations are expressed in the extended symmetry diagrams.

Coxeter group	Extended symmetry	Honeycombs		Chiral extended symmetry	Alternation honeycombs	
[4,3,4]	[4,3,4]	6	_{22} | _{7} | _{8} _{9} | _{25} | _{20}	[1^{+},4,3^{+},4,1^{+}]	(2)	_{1} | _{b}
[4,3,4]	[2^{+}[4,3,4]] =	(1)	_{22}	[2^{+}[(4,3^{+},4,2^{+})]]	(1)	_{1} | _{6}
[4,3,4]	[2^{+}[4,3,4]]	1	_{28}	[2^{+}[(4,3^{+},4,2^{+})]]	(1)	_{a}
[4,3,4]	[2^{+}[4,3,4]]	2	_{27}	[2^{+}[4,3,4]]^{+}	(1)	_{c}
[4,3^{1,1}]	[4,3^{1,1}]	4	_{1} | _{7} | _{10} | _{28}			
[4,3^{1,1}]	[1[4,3^{1,1}]]=[4,3,4] =	(7)	_{22} | _{7} | _{22} | _{7} | _{9} | _{28} | _{25}	[1[1^{+},4,3^{1,1}]]^{+}	(2)	_{1} | _{6} | _{a}
[4,3^{1,1}]	[1[4,3^{1,1}]]=[4,3,4] =	(7)	_{22} | _{7} | _{22} | _{7} | _{9} | _{28} | _{25}	[1[4,3^{1,1}]]^{+} =[4,3,4]^{+}	(1)	_{b}
[3^{[4]}]	[3^{[4]}]	(none)				
[3^{[4]}]	[2^{+}[3^{[4]}]]	1	_{6}			
[3^{[4]}]	[1[3^{[4]}]]=[4,3^{1,1}] =	(2)	_{1} | _{10}			
[3^{[4]}]	[2[3^{[4]}]]=[4,3,4] =	(1)	_{7}			
[3^{[4]}]	[(2^{+},4)[3^{[4]}]]=[2^{+}[4,3,4]] =	(1)	_{28}	[(2^{+},4)[3^{[4]}]]^{+} = [2^{+}[4,3,4]]^{+}	(1)	_{a}

=== Examples ===
The alternated cubic honeycomb is of special importance since its vertices form a cubic close-packing of spheres. The space-filling truss of packed octahedra and tetrahedra was apparently first discovered by Alexander Graham Bell and independently re-discovered by Buckminster Fuller (who called it the octet truss and patented it in the 1940s). . Octet trusses are now among the most common types of truss used in construction.

== Frieze forms ==
If cells are allowed to be uniform tilings, more uniform honeycombs can be defined:

Families:

- ${\tilde{C}}_2$×$A_1$: [4,4,2] Cubic slab honeycombs (3 forms)
- ${\tilde{G}}_2$×$A_1$: [6,3,2] Tri-hexagonal slab honeycombs (8 forms – these and the previous family form the prisms of the eleven convex uniform tilings of the Euclidean plane)
- ${\tilde{A}}_2$×$A_1$: [(3,3,3),2] Triangular slab honeycombs (No new forms)
- ${\tilde{I}}_1$×$A_1$×$A_1$: [∞,2,2] = Cubic column honeycombs (1 form)
- $I_2(p)$×${\tilde{I}}_1$: [p,2,∞] Polygonal column honeycombs (analogous to duoprisms: these look like a single infinite tower of p-gonal prisms, with the remaining space filled with apeirogonal prisms)
- ${\tilde{I}}_1$×${\tilde{I}}_1$×$A_1$: [∞,2,∞,2] = [4,4,2] - = (Same as cubic slab honeycomb family)

Examples (partially drawn)
Cubic slab honeycomb	Alternated hexagonal slab honeycomb	Trihexagonal slab honeycomb
(4) 4^{3}: cube (1) 4^{4}: square tiling	(4) 3^{3}: tetrahedron (3) 3^{4}: octahedron (1) 3^{6}: triangular tiling	(2) 3.4.4: triangular prism (2) 4.4.6: hexagonal prism (1) (3.6)^{2}: trihexagonal tiling

The first two forms shown above are semiregular (uniform with only regular facets), and were listed by Thorold Gosset in 1900 respectively as the 3-ic semi-check and tetroctahedric semi-check.

== Scaliform honeycomb ==
A scaliform honeycomb is vertex-transitive, like a uniform honeycomb, with regular polygon faces while cells and higher elements are only required to be orbiforms, equilateral, with their vertices lying on hyperspheres. For 3D honeycombs, this allows a subset of Johnson solids along with the uniform polyhedra. Some scaliforms can be generated by an alternation process, leaving, for example, pyramid and cupola gaps.

Euclidean honeycomb scaliforms
Frieze slabs			Prismatic stacks
s_{3}{2,6,3},	s_{3}{2,4,4},	s{2,4,4},	3s_{4}{4,4,2,∞},
(1) 3.4.3.4: triangular cupola (2) 3.4.6: triangular cupola (1) 3.3.3.3: octahedron (1) 3.6.3.6: trihexagonal tiling	(1) 3.4.4.4: square cupola (2) 3.4.8: square cupola (1) 3.3.3: tetrahedron (1) 4.8.8: truncated square tiling	(1) 3.3.3.3: square pyramid (4) 3.3.4: square pyramid (4) 3.3.3: tetrahedron (1) 4.4.4.4: square tiling	(1) 3.3.3.3: square pyramid (4) 3.3.4: square pyramid (4) 3.3.3: tetrahedron (4) 4.4.4: cube

== Hyperbolic forms ==
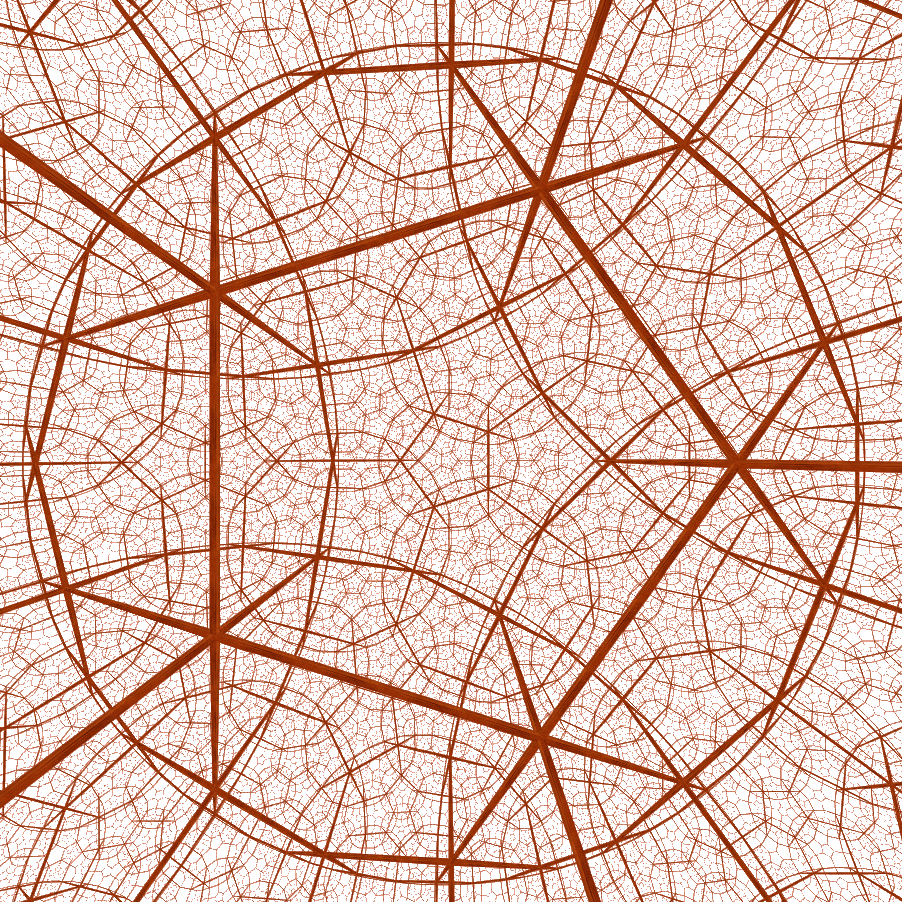
The order-4 dodecahedral honeycomb, {5,3,4} in perspective

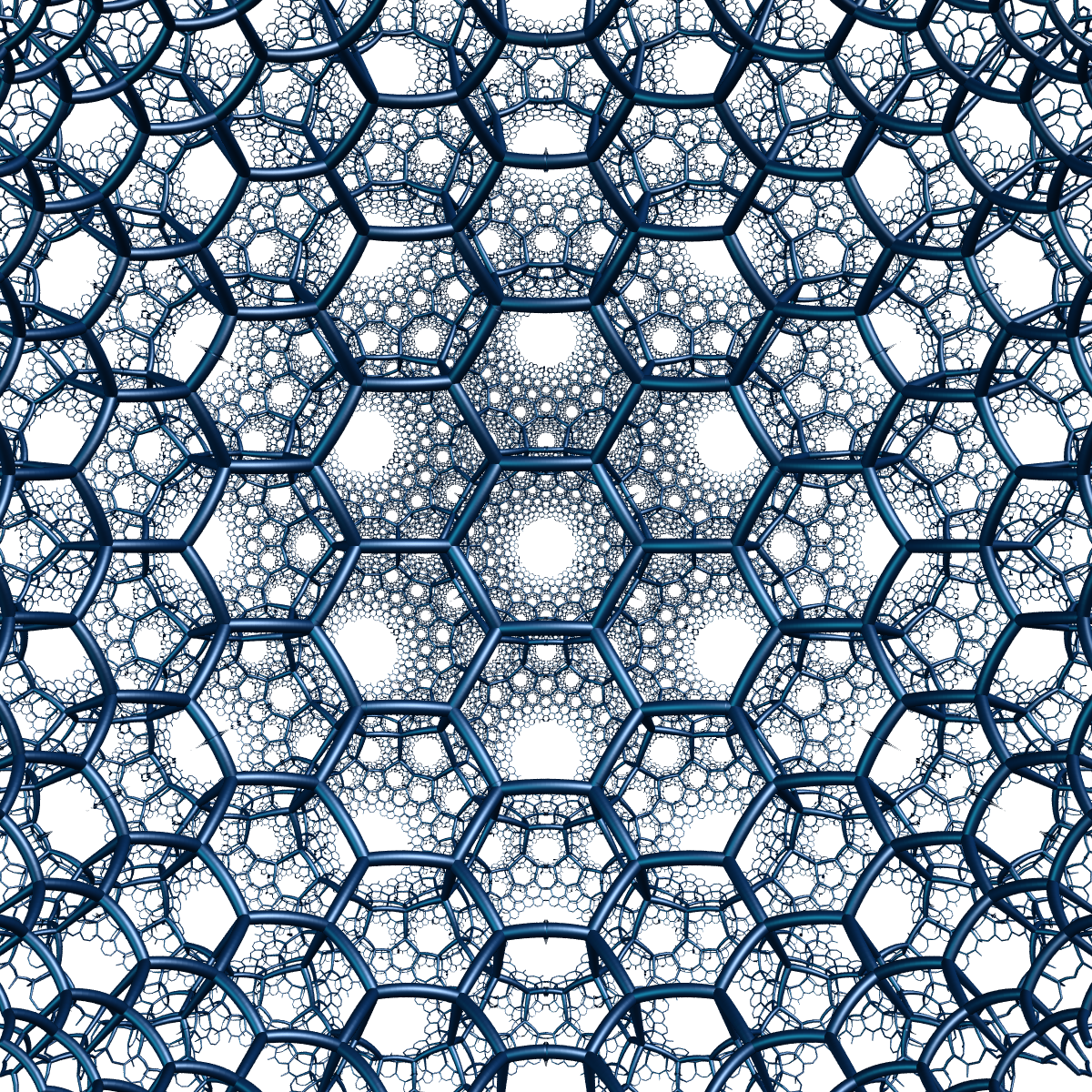
The paracompact hexagonal tiling honeycomb, {6,3,3}, in perspective

There are 9 Coxeter group families of compact uniform honeycombs in hyperbolic 3-space, generated as Wythoff constructions, and represented by ring permutations of the Coxeter-Dynkin diagrams for each family.

From these 9 families, there are a total of 76 unique honeycombs generated:

- [3,5,3] : - 9 forms
- [5,3,4] : - 15 forms
- [5,3,5] : - 9 forms
- [5,3^{1,1}] : - 11 forms (7 overlap with [5,3,4] family, 4 are unique)
- [(4,3,3,3)] : - 9 forms
- [(4,3,4,3)] : - 6 forms
- [(5,3,3,3)] : - 9 forms
- [(5,3,4,3)] : - 9 forms
- [(5,3,5,3)] : - 6 forms

Several non-Wythoffian forms outside the list of 76 are known; it is not known how many there are.

=== Paracompact hyperbolic forms ===
There are also 23 paracompact Coxeter groups of rank 4. These families can produce uniform honeycombs with unbounded facets or vertex figure, including ideal vertices at infinity:

Simplectic hyperbolic paracompact group summary
Type	Coxeter groups	Unique honeycomb count
Linear graphs	| | | | | |	4×15+6+8+8 = 82
Tridental graphs	| |	4+4+0 = 8
Cyclic graphs	| | | | | | | |	4×9+5+1+4+1+0 = 47
Loop-n-tail graphs	| | |	4+4+4+2 = 14

Fundamental convex regular and uniform honeycombs in dimensions 2–9
Space	Family	${\tilde{A}}_{n-1}$	${\tilde{C}}_{n-1}$	${\tilde{B}}_{n-1}$	${\tilde{D}}_{n-1}$	${\tilde{G}}_2$ / ${\tilde{F}}_4$ / ${\tilde{E}}_{n-1}$
E^{2}	Uniform tiling	0_{[3]}	δ_{3}	hδ_{3}	qδ_{3}	Hexagonal
E^{3}	Uniform convex honeycomb	0_{[4]}	δ_{4}	hδ_{4}	qδ_{4}	
E^{4}	Uniform 4-honeycomb	0_{[5]}	δ_{5}	hδ_{5}	qδ_{5}	24-cell honeycomb
E^{5}	Uniform 5-honeycomb	0_{[6]}	δ_{6}	hδ_{6}	qδ_{6}	
E^{6}	Uniform 6-honeycomb	0_{[7]}	δ_{7}	hδ_{7}	qδ_{7}	2_{22}
E^{7}	Uniform 7-honeycomb	0_{[8]}	δ_{8}	hδ_{8}	qδ_{8}	1_{33} • 3_{31}
E^{8}	Uniform 8-honeycomb	0_{[9]}	δ_{9}	hδ_{9}	qδ_{9}	1_{52} • 2_{51} • 5_{21}
E^{9}	Uniform 9-honeycomb	0_{[10]}	δ_{10}	hδ_{10}	qδ_{10}	
E^{10}	Uniform 10-honeycomb	0_{[11]}	δ_{11}	hδ_{11}	qδ_{11}	
E^{n−1}	Uniform (n−1)-honeycomb	0_{[n]}	δ_{n}	hδ_{n}	qδ_{n}	1_{k2} • 2_{k1} • k_{21}
