= Quaquaversal tiling =

Non-periodic tiling of space by prisms

The substitution rule for the quaquaversal tiling.

In geometry, the quaquaversal tiling is a nonperiodic tiling of Euclidean 3-space introduced by John Conway and Charles Radin. It is analogous to the pinwheel tiling in 2 dimensions having tile orientations that are dense in SO(3). The basic solid tiles are 30-60-90 triangular prisms arranged in a pattern such that some copies are rotated by π/3, and some are rotated by π/2 in a perpendicular direction.

They construct the group G(p,q) given by a rotation of 2π/p and a perpendicular rotation by 2π/q; the orientations in the quaquaversal tiling are given by G(6,4). G(p,1) are cyclic groups, G(p,2) are dihedral groups, G(4,4) is the octahedral group, and all other G(p,q) are infinite and dense in SO(3); if p and q are odd and ≥3, then G(p,q) is a free group.

Radin and Lorenzo Sadun constructed similar honeycombs based on a tiling related to the Penrose tilings and the pinwheel tiling; the former has orientations in G(10,4), and the latter has orientations in G(p,4) with the irrational rotation 2π/p = arctan(1/2). They show that G(p,4) is dense in SO(3) for the aforementioned value of p, and whenever cos(2π/p) is transcendental.
