= Triangular prismatic honeycomb =

Triangular prismatic honeycomb
Type	Uniform honeycomb
Schläfli symbol	{3,6}×{∞} or t_{0,3}{3,6,2,∞}
Coxeter diagrams	
Space group Coxeter notation	[6,3,2,∞] [3^{[3]},2,∞] [(3^{[3]})^{+},2,∞]
Dual	Hexagonal prismatic honeycomb
Properties	vertex-transitive

The triangular prismatic honeycomb or triangular prismatic cellulation is a space-filling tessellation (or honeycomb) in Euclidean 3-space. It is composed entirely of triangular prisms.

It is constructed from a triangular tiling extruded into prisms.

It is one of 28 convex uniform honeycombs.

It consists of 1 + 6 + 1 = 8 edges meeting at a vertex, There are 6 triangular prism cells meeting at an edge and faces are shared between 2 cells.

== Related honeycombs ==
=== Hexagonal prismatic honeycomb ===
Hexagonal prismatic honeycomb
Type	Uniform honeycomb
Schläfli symbols	{6,3}×{∞} or t_{0,1,3}{6,3,2,∞}
Coxeter diagrams	
Cell types	4.4.6
Vertex figure	triangular bipyramid
Space group Coxeter notation	[6,3,2,∞] [3^{[3]},2,∞]
Dual	Triangular prismatic honeycomb
Properties	vertex-transitive

The hexagonal prismatic honeycomb or hexagonal prismatic cellulation is a space-filling tessellation (or honeycomb) in Euclidean 3-space made up of hexagonal prisms.

It is constructed from a hexagonal tiling extruded into prisms.

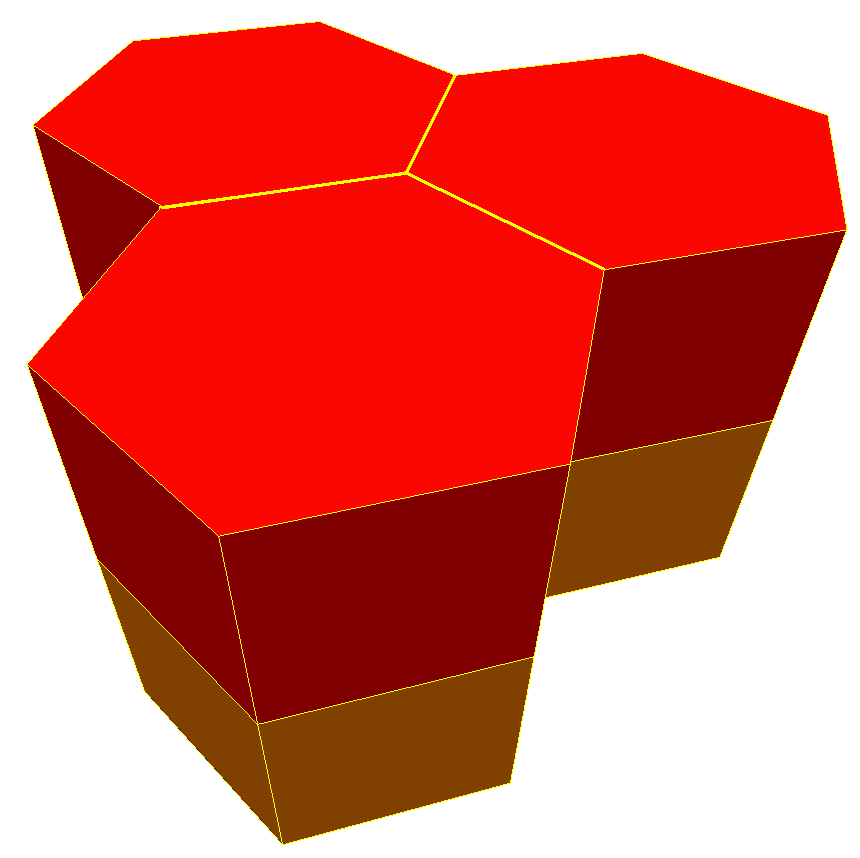

It is one of 28 convex uniform honeycombs.

This honeycomb can be alternated into the gyrated tetrahedral-octahedral honeycomb, with pairs of tetrahedra existing in the alternated gaps (instead of a triangular bipyramid).

There are 1 + 3 + 1 = 5 edges meeting at a vertex, 3 hexagonal prism cells meeting at an edge, and faces are shared between 2 cells.

=== Trihexagonal prismatic honeycomb ===
Trihexagonal prismatic honeycomb
Type	Uniform honeycomb
Schläfli symbol	r{6,3}×{∞} or t_{1,3}{6,3,2,∞}
Vertex figure	Octahedra
Coxeter diagram	
Cell type	6.4.4; 3.4.4
Face type	{3}, {4}, {6}
Space group Coxeter notation	[6,3,2,∞] [3^{[3]},2,∞]
Properties	vertex-transitive

The trihexagonal prismatic honeycomb or trihexagonal prismatic cellulation is a space-filling tessellation (or honeycomb) in Euclidean 3-space. It is composed of hexagonal prisms and triangular prisms in a ratio of 1:2.

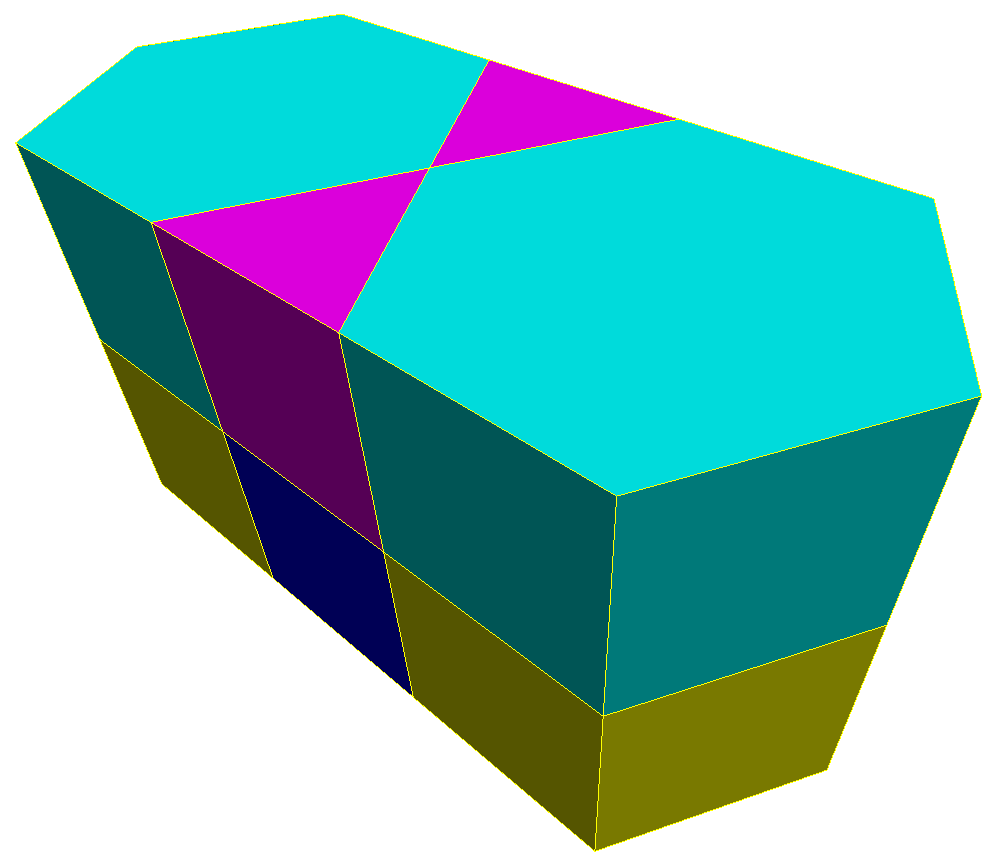

It is constructed from a trihexagonal tiling extruded into prisms.

It is one of 28 convex uniform honeycombs.

=== Truncated hexagonal prismatic honeycomb ===
Truncated hexagonal prismatic honeycomb
Type	Uniform honeycomb
Schläfli symbol	t{6,3}×{∞} or t_{0,1,3}{6,3,2,∞}
Coxeter diagram	
Cell types	4.4.12; 3.4.4
Face types	{3}, {4}, {12}
Edge figures	Square, Isosceles triangle
Vertex figure	Triangular bipyramid
Space group Coxeter notation	[6,3,2,∞]
Properties	vertex-transitive

The truncated hexagonal prismatic honeycomb or tomo-trihexagonal prismatic cellulation is a space-filling tessellation (or honeycomb) in Euclidean 3-space. It is composed of dodecagonal prisms, and triangular prisms in a ratio of 1:2.

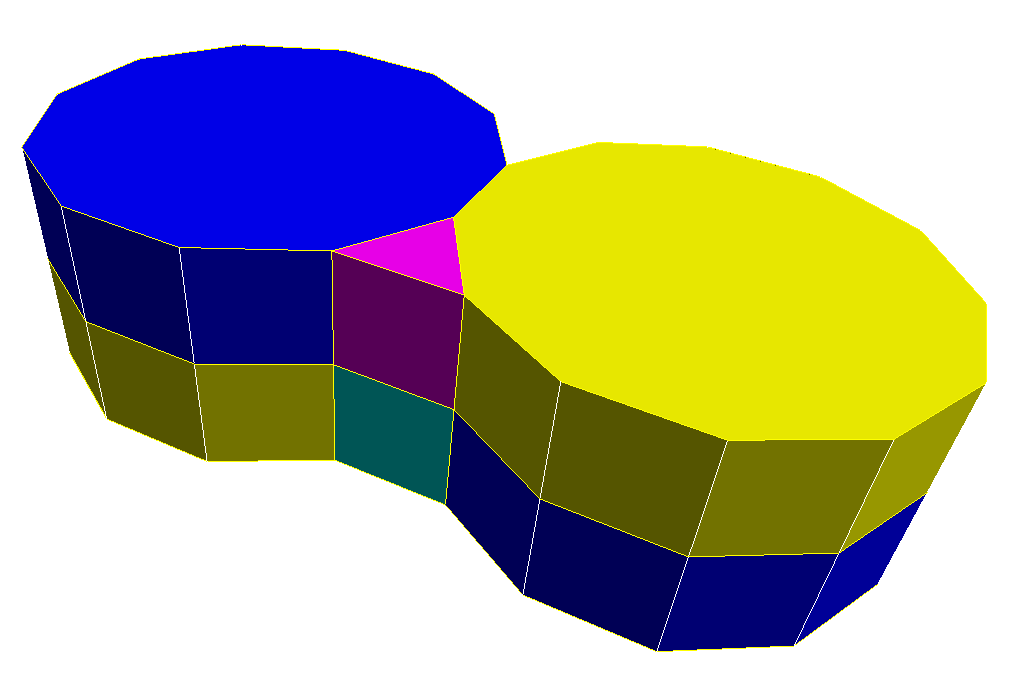

It is constructed from a truncated hexagonal tiling extruded into prisms.

It is one of 28 convex uniform honeycombs.

=== Rhombitrihexagonal prismatic honeycomb ===
Rhombitrihexagonal prismatic honeycomb
Type	Uniform honeycomb
Vertex figure	Trapezoidal bipyramid
Schläfli symbol	rr{6,3}×{∞} or t_{0,2,3}{6,3,2,∞} s_{2}{3,6}×{∞}
Coxeter diagram	
Space group Coxeter notation	[6,3,2,∞]
Properties	vertex-transitive

The rhombitrihexagonal prismatic honeycomb or rhombitrihexagonal prismatic cellulation is a space-filling tessellation (or honeycomb) in Euclidean 3-space. It is composed of hexagonal prisms, cubes, and triangular prisms in a ratio of 1:3:2.

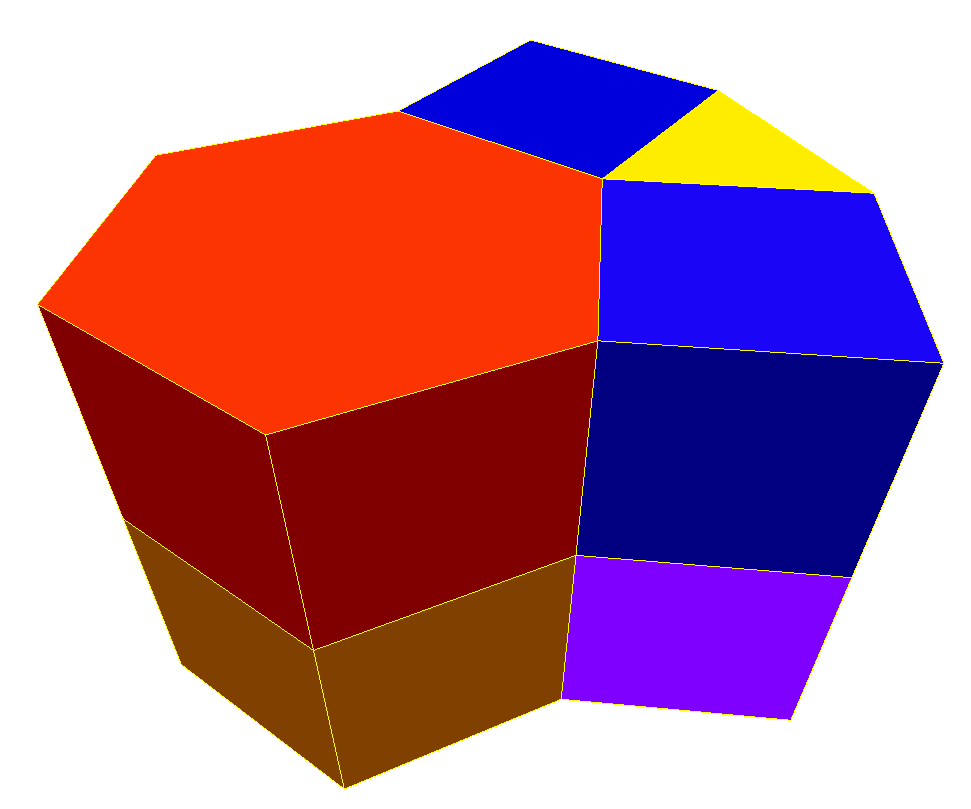

It is constructed from a rhombitrihexagonal tiling extruded into prisms.

It is one of 28 convex uniform honeycombs.

=== Truncated trihexagonal prismatic honeycomb ===
Truncated trihexagonal prismatic honeycomb
Type
Schläfli symbol
Coxeter diagram
Space group
Coxeter notation
Vertex figure
Dual
Properties

The truncated trihexagonal prismatic honeycomb or tomo-trihexagonal prismatic cellulation is a space-filling tessellation (or honeycomb) in Euclidean 3-space. It is composed of dodecagonal prisms, hexagonal prisms, and cubes in a ratio of 1:2:3.

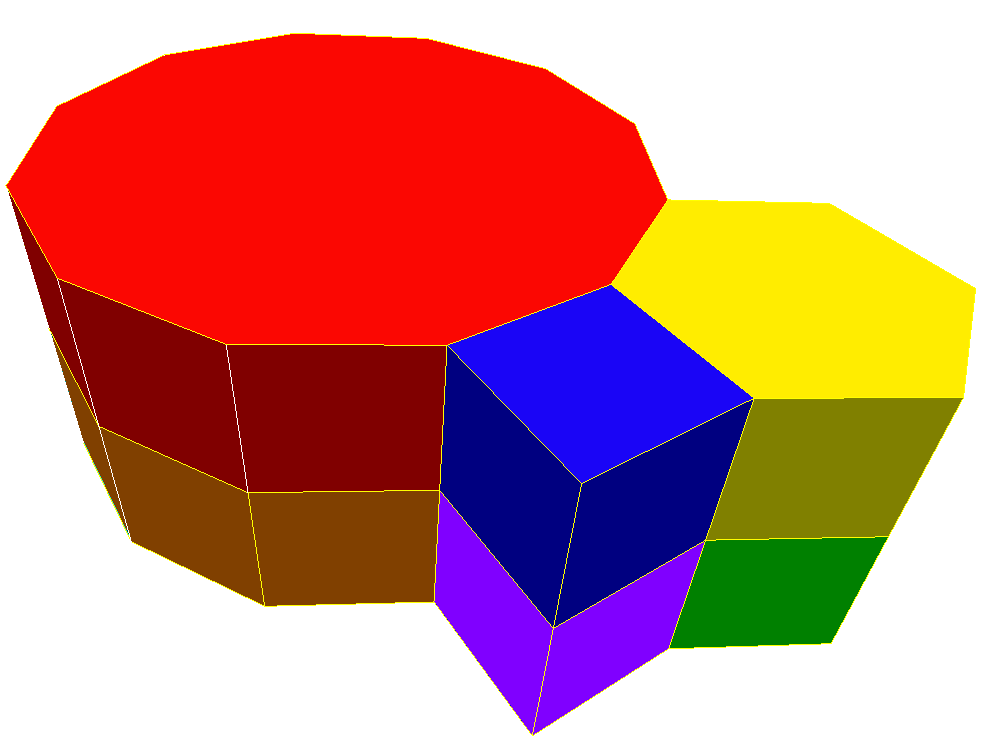

It is constructed from a truncated trihexagonal tiling extruded into prisms.

It is one of 28 convex uniform honeycombs.

=== Snub trihexagonal prismatic honeycomb ===
Snub trihexagonal prismatic honeycomb
Type	Uniform honeycomb
Schläfli symbol	sr{6,3}×{∞}
Coxeter diagram	
Symmetry	[(6,3)^{+},2,∞]
Properties	vertex-transitive

The snub trihexagonal prismatic honeycomb or simo-trihexagonal prismatic cellulation is a space-filling tessellation (or honeycomb) in Euclidean 3-space. It is composed of hexagonal prisms and triangular prisms in a ratio of 1:8.

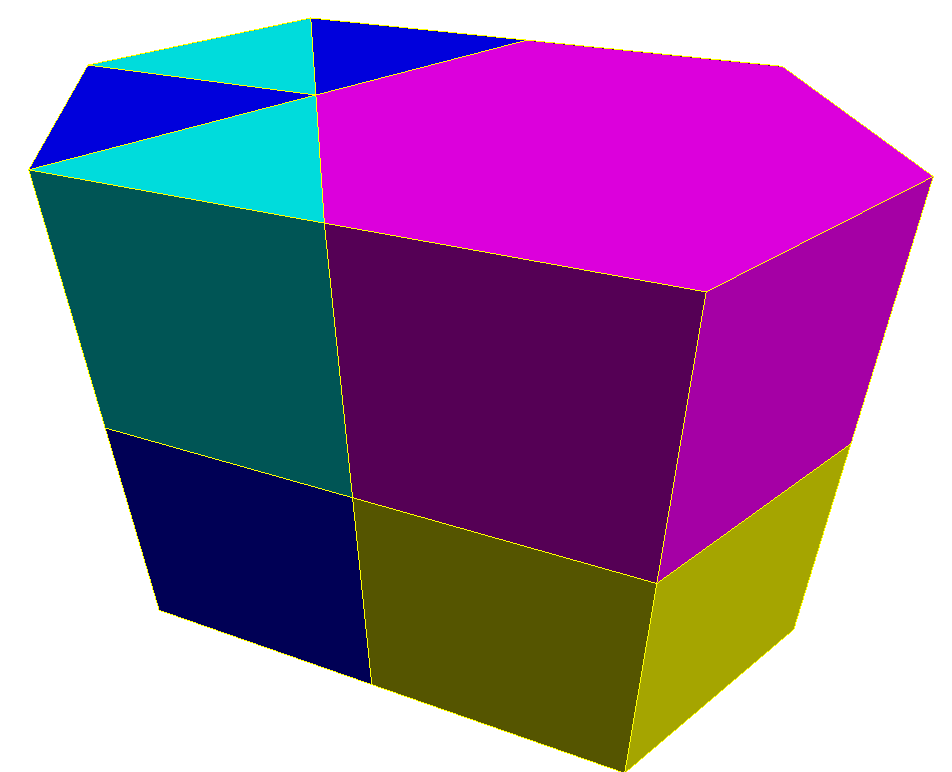

It is constructed from a snub trihexagonal tiling extruded into prisms.

It is one of 28 convex uniform honeycombs.

=== Snub trihexagonal antiprismatic honeycomb ===
Snub trihexagonal antiprismatic honeycomb
Type
Schläfli symbol
Coxeter-Dynkin diagram
Cells
Vertex figure
Symmetry
Properties

A snub trihexagonal antiprismatic honeycomb can be constructed by alternation of the truncated trihexagonal prismatic honeycomb, although it can not be made uniform, but it can be given Coxeter diagram: and has symmetry [6,3,2,∞]^{+}. It makes hexagonal antiprisms from the dodecagonal prisms, octahedra (as triangular antiprisms) from the hexagonal prisms, tetrahedra (as tetragonal disphenoids) from the cubes, and two tetrahedra from the triangular bipyramids.

=== Elongated triangular prismatic honeycomb ===
Elongated triangular prismatic honeycomb
Type	Uniform honeycomb
Schläfli symbols	{3,6}:e×{∞} s{∞}h_{1}{∞}×{∞}
Coxeter diagrams	
Space group Coxeter notation	[∞,2^{+},∞,2,∞] [(∞,2)^{+},∞,2,∞]
Properties	vertex-transitive

The elongated triangular prismatic honeycomb or elongated antiprismatic prismatic cellulation is a space-filling tessellation (or honeycomb) in Euclidean 3-space. It is composed of cubes and triangular prisms in a ratio of 1:2.

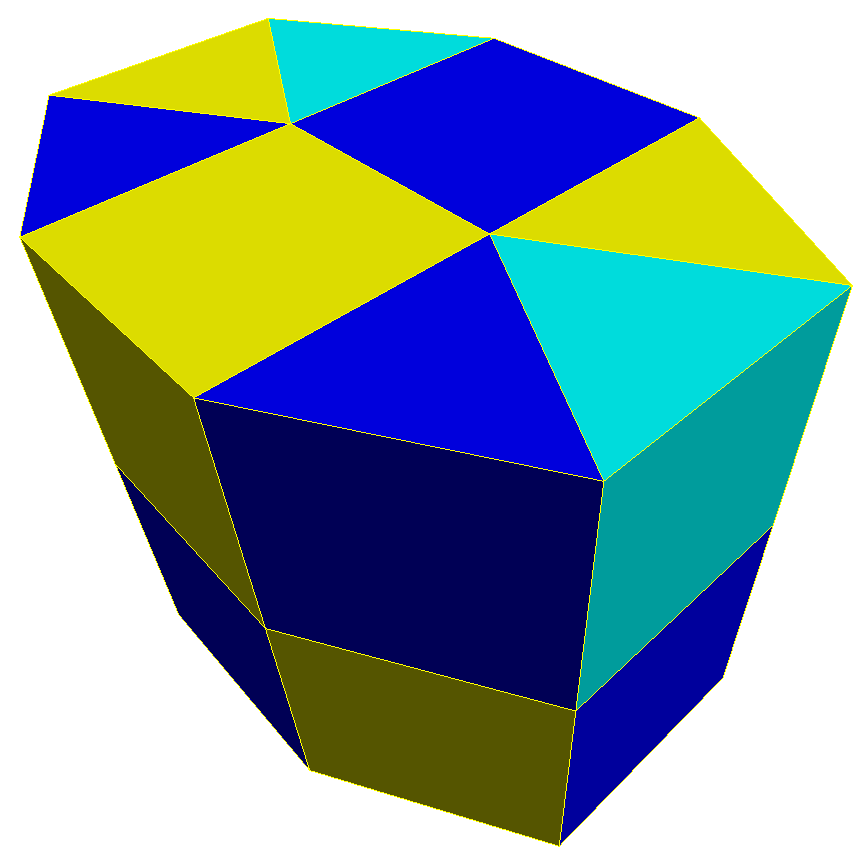

It is constructed from an elongated triangular tiling extruded into prisms.

It is one of 28 convex uniform honeycombs.9

=== Gyrated triangular prismatic honeycomb ===
The gyrated triangular prismatic honeycomb or parasquare fastigial cellulation is a space-filling tessellation (or honeycomb) in Euclidean 3-space made up of triangular prisms. It is vertex-uniform with 12 triangular prisms per vertex.

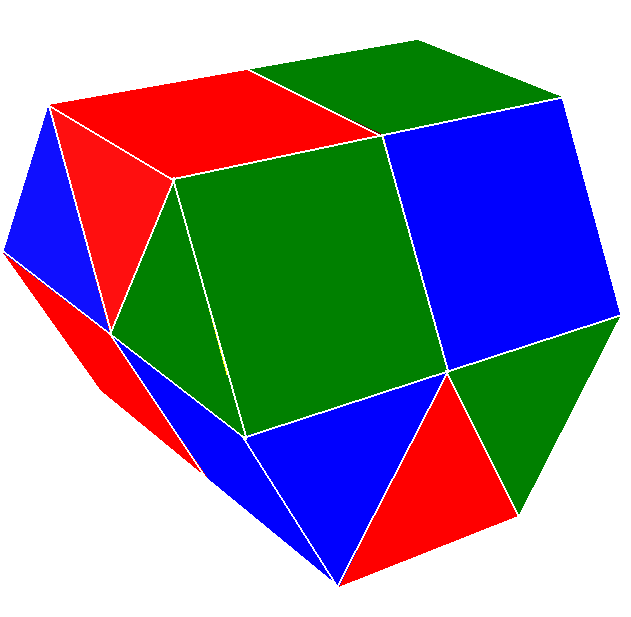
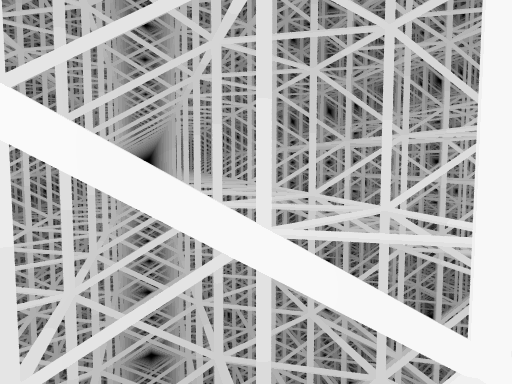

It can be seen as parallel planes of square tiling with alternating offsets caused by layers of paired triangular prisms. The prisms in each layer are rotated by a right angle to those in the next layer.

It is one of 28 convex uniform honeycombs.

Pairs of triangular prisms can be combined to create gyrobifastigium cells. The resulting honeycomb is closely related but not equivalent: it has the same vertices and edges, but different two-dimensional faces and three-dimensional cells.

=== Gyroelongated triangular prismatic honeycomb ===
Gyroelongated triangular prismatic honeycomb
Type	Uniform honeycomb
Schläfli symbols	{3,6}:ge×{∞} {4,4}f_{1}{∞}
Vertex figure	
Space group Coxeter notation	[4,(4,2^{+},∞,2^{+})] ?
Dual	-
Properties	vertex-transitive

The gyroelongated triangular prismatic honeycomb or elongated parasquare fastigial cellulation is a uniform space-filling tessellation (or honeycomb) in Euclidean 3-space. It is composed of cubes and triangular prisms in a ratio of 1:2.

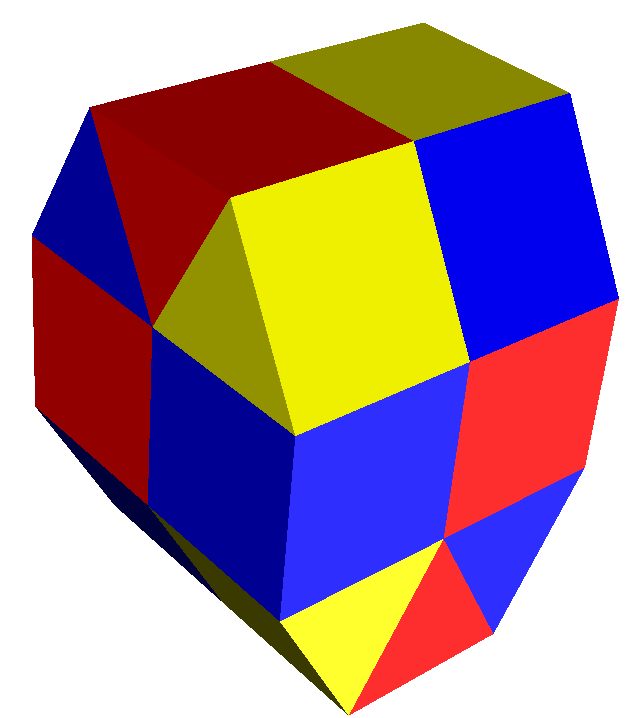
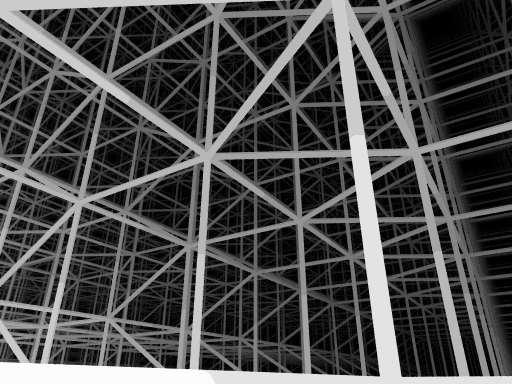

It is created by alternating layers of cubes and triangular prisms, with the prisms alternating in orientation by 90 degrees.

It is related to the elongated triangular prismatic honeycomb which has the triangular prisms with the same orientation.

This is related to a space-filling polyhedron, elongated gyrobifastigium, where cube and two opposite triangular prisms are augmented together as a single polyhedron:

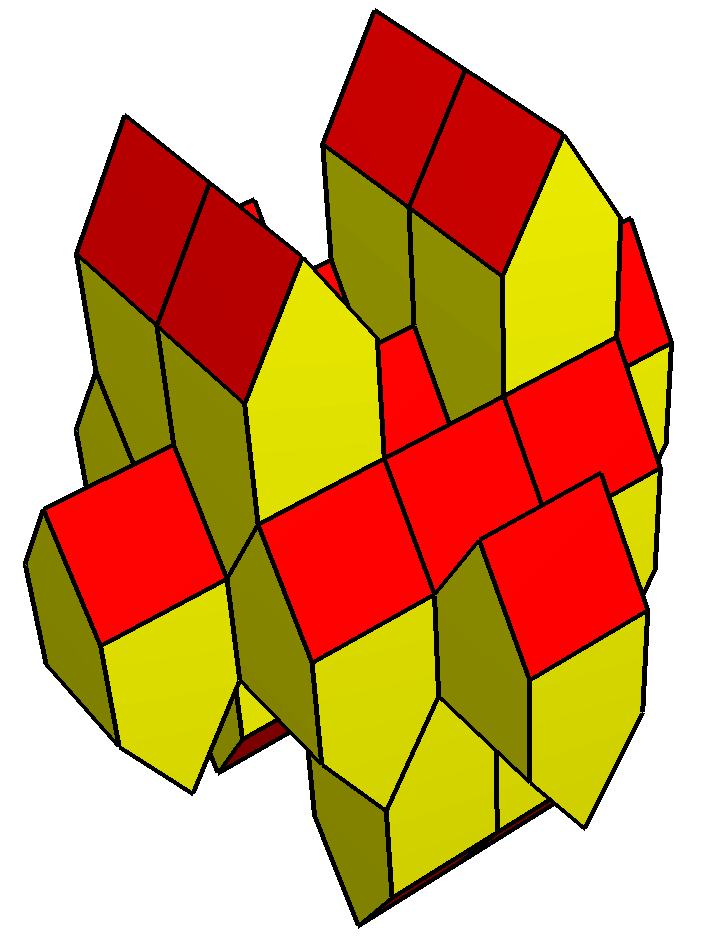
