= Eddie Andreini =

American pilot

- Born: March 28, 1937
- Died: May 4, 2014 (aged 77); Solano County, California, USA
- Occupation: stunt pilot

Edward Andreini (March 28, 1937 – May 4, 2014) was an American aerobatic pilot based in Half Moon Bay, California.

On May 4, 2014, Andreini died while performing aerial acrobatics at an airshow in Travis Air Force Base in Solano County, California, when his Stearman biplane crashed into the ground. He was 77.

In December 2013, Andreini was entered into the International Council of Air Shows.

The Eddie Andreini Sr. Airfield near Half Moon Bay was named in his honor to commemorate the many accomplishments and contributions that Eddie Andreini Sr. made to San Mateo County.
