= Elios Andreini =

Italian politician (1940–2022)

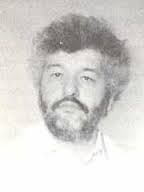

Elios Andreini (8 September 1940 – 8 June 2022) was an Italian politician.

== Biography ==
Elios Andreini was born on 8 September 1940 in Bagnacavallo, Italy. Already a teacher, he was Senator for the Communist Party from 9 July 1987 to 22 April 1992.

Andreini was the author of local history books. He died in Adria on 8 June 2022, at the age of 81.
