= Eddie Andreini Sr. Airfield =

Airport in San Mateo County, California, USA

Eddie Andreini Sr. Airfield Half Moon Bay Airport
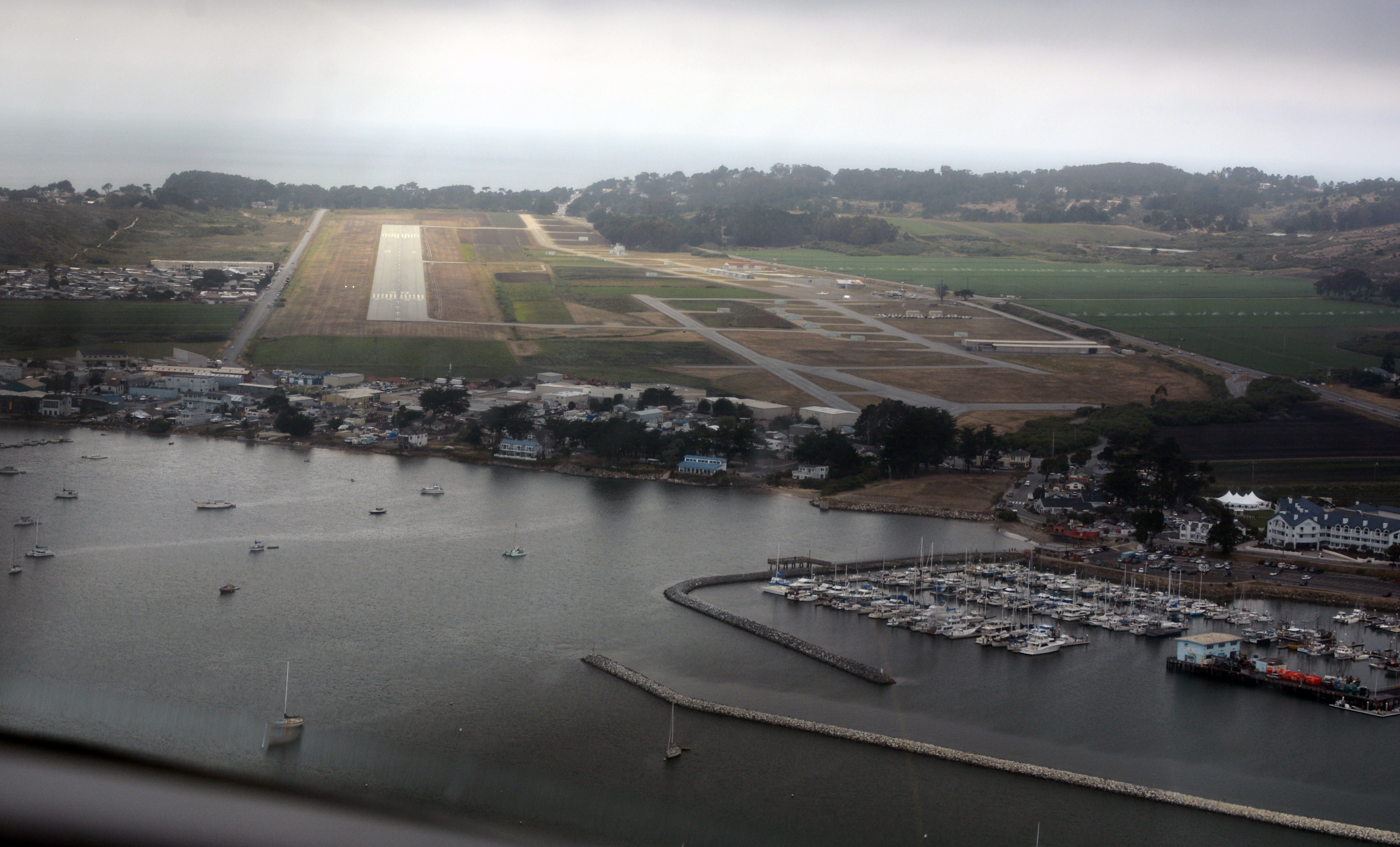
- 2015 photo short final runway 30
- IATA: HAF; ICAO: KHAF; FAA LID: HAF

Summary
- Airport type: Public
- Owner: San Mateo County
- Location: Moss Beach, near Half Moon Bay, California
- Elevation AMSL: 66 ft (20 m)
- Coordinates: 37°30′48″N 122°30′04″W

Map
- Location

Runways
Direction	Length		Surface
Direction	ft	m	Surface
12/30	5,000	1,524	Asphalt/concrete

Statistics (2020)
- Aircraft operations: 50,150
- Based aircraft: 13
- Source: Federal Aviation Administration

Eddie Andreini Sr. Airfield, officially Half Moon Bay Airport (IATA: HAF, ICAO: KHAF, FAA LID: HAF), is a public airport in San Mateo County, California, United States, six miles (9.7 km) northwest of Half Moon Bay, between Princeton-by-the-Sea and Moss Beach. The airport is on the Pacific Coast, south of San Francisco.

== History ==
The Half Moon Bay Airport is about 20 miles south of San Francisco. It was built by the California State Highway Department for the U.S. Army in 1942 as an auxiliary airfield for Salinas Army Air Base.

Known as Half Moon Bay Flight Strip, the airport supported Salinas AAF's ground support mission to train light observation and reconnaissance squadrons. These were light aircraft and fighters modified with camera equipment. Salinas Army Airbase also had the mission of conducting coastal patrols. As such, the airfield would have been garrisoned by a detachment of the 301st Base Headquarters and Air Base Squadron. With the reorganization of the Army Air Forces that took place in the first quarter of 1944, the site was transferred to Air Technical Service Command and garrisoned by its own unit, the 4159th Army Air Forces Base Unit (Air Base). The mission of this unit was to operate the airfield for emergency landings, transient aircraft, and training missions. Other than refueling aircraft, no aircraft services would have been available.

On June 1, 1945, the War Department issued a five-year permit to the U.S. Navy to operate the Site as "Outlying Field, Half Moon Bay". Half Moon Bay field became an outlying field for Naval Air Station Moffett Field, to furnish facilities for utility aircraft providing target towing service for the Anti-Aircraft Training Center, Point Montara, California.

San Mateo County acquired the airport from the Navy in 1947. It is an important business, transportation and emergency service asset to the community.

== Facilities ==
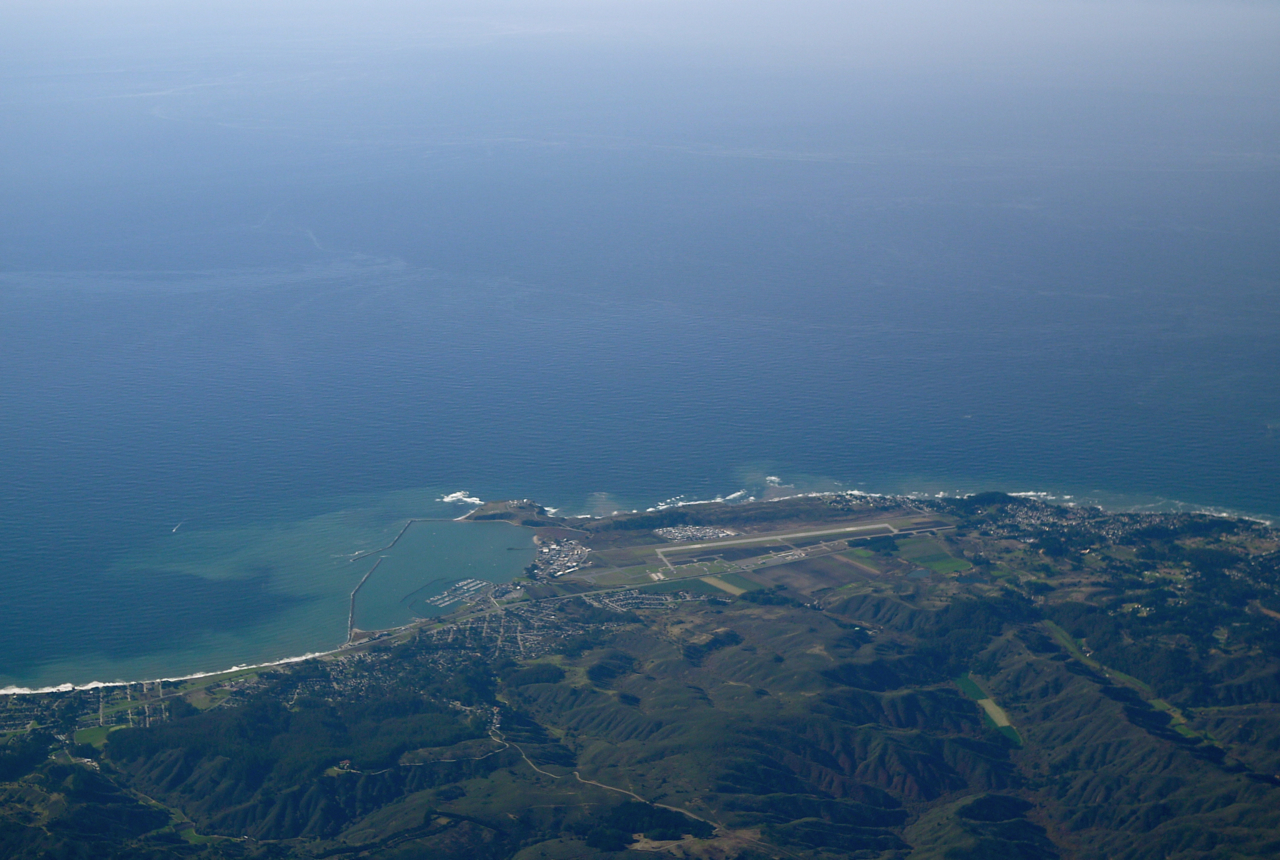
Half Moon Bay Airport, facing west

Half Moon Bay Airport covers 325 acres (132 ha) at an elevation of 66 feet (20 m). Its asphalt/concrete runway, 12/30, is 5,000 by 150 feet (1,524 by 46 metres).

Half Moon Bay Airport provides a variety of emergency service and response functions including: Air ambulance and Medevac flights; law enforcement and homeland security patrols; Coast Guard sea-rescue operations; and use as a disaster relief staging site for the airlifting of emergency supplies in the event that roads are closed during a disaster or emergency.

Half Moon Bay Airport is home to about 80 aircraft and several related businesses. The airport is self-funded through airport user and business fees and receives no money from the county's general fund.

In the year ending January 15, 2020, the airport had 50,150 aircraft operations, average 137 per day: >99% general aviation and <1% air taxi. As of December 2020, 13 aircraft were based at the airport: 12 single-engine and 1 multi-engine.

== Pacific Coast Dream Machines ==
The airport hosts an annual benefit event in April, Pacific Coast Dream Machines, which features aircraft and automobiles.

== December 2015 airport renaming ==
On December 8, 2015, the San Mateo County Board of Supervisors renamed the airport the Eddie Andreini Sr. Airfield to commemorate the many accomplishments and contributions that Andreini Sr. made to San Mateo County. The airport is still registered as Half Moon Bay Airport with the US government and FAA.

The International Council of Air Shows awarded Andreini the Sword of Excellence Award, the highest honor an air show pilot can receive in 2004 and inducted him into the Air Show Hall of Fame in 2013 for his performances and generosity in mentoring younger air show pilots.

== See also ==
- List of airports in the San Francisco Bay area
