= Charles Radin =

American mathematician

Charles Lewis Radin is an American mathematician, known for his work on aperiodic tilings and in particular for defining the pinwheel tiling and, with John Horton Conway, the quaquaversal tiling.

== Education and career ==
Radin did his undergraduate studies at City College of New York, graduating in 1965, and then did his graduate studies at the University of Rochester, earning a Ph.D. in 1970 under the supervision of Gérard Emch. Since 1976 he has been on the faculty of the University of Texas at Austin.

== Awards and honors ==
In 2012 he became a fellow of the American Mathematical Society.

== Selected publications ==
- Radin, Charles; Wolff, Mayhew (1992), "Space tilings and local isomorphism", Geometriae Dedicata, 42 (3): 355–360, doi:10.1007/BF02414073, MR 1164542, S2CID 16334831.
- Radin, Charles (1994), "The pinwheel tilings of the plane", Annals of Mathematics, Second Series, 139 (3): 661–702, doi:10.2307/2118575, JSTOR 2118575, MR 1283873.
- Conway, John H.; Radin, Charles (1998), "Quaquaversal tilings and rotations", Inventiones Mathematicae, 132 (1): 179–188, Bibcode:1998InMat.132..179C, doi:10.1007/s002220050221, MR 1618635, S2CID 14194250.
- Radin, Charles (1999), Miles of Tiles, Student Mathematical Library, vol. 1, Providence, RI: American Mathematical Society, ISBN 978-0-8218-1933-3, MR 1707270.
- as editor with Mark J. Bowick, Govind Menon, and David Kinderlehrer: Mathematics and Materials, American Mathematical Society 2017
