= Cubic cupola =

Cubic cupola
Schlegel diagram
Type	Polyhedral cupola	
Schläfli symbol	{4,3} v rr{4,3}	
Cells	28	1 rr{4,3} 1+6 {4,3} 12 {}×{3} 8 {3,3}
Faces	80	32 triangles 48 squares
Edges	84	
Vertices	32	
Dual		
Symmetry group	[4,3,1], order 48	
Properties	convex, regular-faced	

In 4-dimensional geometry, the cubic cupola is a 4-polytope bounded by a rhombicuboctahedron, a parallel cube, connected by 6 square prisms, 12 triangular prisms, 8 triangular pyramids.

== Related polytopes ==
The cubic cupola can be sliced off from a runcinated tesseract, on a hyperplane parallel to cubic cell. The cupola can be seen in an edge-centered (B_{3}) orthogonal projection of the runcinated tesseract:

Runcinated tesseract	Cube (cupola top)	Rhombicuboctahedron (cupola base)
B_{2} Coxeter plane
B_{3} Coxeter plane

== See also ==
- Cubic pyramid
- Octahedral cupola
- Runcinated tesseract
