= Prismatoid =

Polyhedron with all vertices in two parallel planes

Prismatoid with parallel faces A_{1} and A_{3}, midway cross-section A_{2}, and height h.

In geometry, a prismatoid is a convex polyhedron whose vertices all lie in two parallel planes. Its lateral faces can be trapezoids or triangles. If both planes have the same number of vertices, and the lateral faces are either parallelograms or trapezoids, it is called a prismoid.

== Volume ==
If the areas of the two parallel faces are A_{1} and A_{3}, the cross-sectional area of the intersection of the prismatoid with a plane midway between the two parallel faces is A_{2}, and the height (the distance between the two parallel faces) is h, then the volume of the prismatoid is given by
$$V = \frac{h(A_1 + 4A_2 + A_3)}{6}.$$
This formula follows immediately by integrating the area parallel to the two planes of vertices by Simpson's rule, since that rule is exact for integration of polynomials of degree up to 3, and in this case the area is at most a quadratic function in the height.

== Prismatoid families ==
| Pyramids | Wedges | Parallelepipeds | Prisms | Antiprisms | Cupolae | Frusta |

Families of prismatoids include:

- Pyramids, in which one plane contains only a single point;
- Wedges, in which one plane contains only two points;
- Prisms, whose polygons in each plane are congruent and joined by rectangles or parallelograms;
- Antiprisms, whose polygons in each plane are congruent and joined by an alternating strip of triangles;
- Star antiprisms;
- Cupolae, in which the polygon in one plane contains twice as many points as the other and is joined to it by alternating triangles and rectangles;
- Frusta obtained by truncation of a pyramid or a cone;
- Quadrilateral-faced hexahedral prismatoids:
  1. Parallelepipeds – six parallelogram faces
  2. Rhombohedrons – six rhombus faces
  3. Trigonal trapezohedra – six congruent rhombus faces
  4. Cuboids – six rectangular faces
  5. Quadrilateral frusta – an apex-truncated square pyramid
  6. Cube – six square faces

== Higher dimensions ==
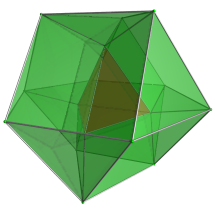
A tetrahedral-cuboctahedral cupola.

In general, a polytope is prismatoidal if its vertices exist in two hyperplanes. For example, in four dimensions, two polyhedra can be placed in two parallel 3-spaces, and connected with polyhedral sides.
