= Zonotope =

Minkowksi sum of line segments

A zonotope is a convex polytope that can be described as the Minkowski sum of a finite set of line segments in $\mathbb{R}^d$ or, equivalently as a projection of a hypercube. Zonotopes are intimately connected to hyperplane arrangements and matroid theory.

== Definition and basic properties ==
The Minkowski sum of a finite set of line segments in $\mathbb{R}^d$ forms a type of convex polytope called a zonotope. More precisely, a zonotope $Z$ generated by the vectors $w_1,...,w_n\in\mathbb{R}^d$ is a translation of

$$Z = \{a_1 w_1 + \cdots + a_n w_n | \; 0 \le a_j \le 1 \text{ for all } j \}
= \mathbf{W} \, [0,1]^n ,$$

where $\mathbf{W}$ is the $d \times n$ matrix whose j'th column is $w_j$. The latter description makes it clear that a zonotope is precisely the translation of a projection of an n-dimensional cube.

In the special case where $w_1,...,w_n\in\mathbb{R}^d$ are linearly independent, the zonotope $Z$ is a (possibly lower-dimensional) parallelotope.

The facets of any zonotope are themselves zonotopes of one lower dimension. Examples of four-dimensional zonotopes include the tesseract (Minkowski sums of mutually perpendicular equal length line segments), the omnitruncated 5-cell, and the truncated 24-cell. Every permutohedron is a zonotope.

== Zonotopes and matroids ==
Fix a zonotope $Z$ generated by the vectors $w_1,\dots,w_n \in \mathbb{R}^d$ and let $\mathbf{W}$ be the $d \times n$ matrix whose columns are the $w_i$. Then the vector matroid ${\mathcal{M}}$ on the columns of $\mathbf{W}$ encodes a wealth of information about $Z$, that is, many properties of $Z$ are purely combinatorial in nature.

For example, pairs of opposite facets of $Z$ are naturally indexed by the cocircuits of $\mathcal{M}$ and if we consider the oriented matroid $\mathcal{M}$ represented by $\mathbf{W}$, then we obtain a bijection between facets of $Z$ and signed cocircuits of $\mathcal{M}$ which extends to a poset anti-isomorphism between the face lattice of $Z$ and the covectors of $\mathcal{M}$ ordered by component-wise extension of $0 \prec +, -$. In particular, if $M$ and $N$ are two matrices that differ by a projective transformation then their respective zonotopes are combinatorially equivalent. The converse of the previous statement does not hold: the segment $[0,2] \subset \mathbb{R}$ is a zonotope and is generated by both $\{2\mathbf{e}_1\}$ and by $\{\mathbf{e}_1, \mathbf{e}_1\}$ whose corresponding matrices, $[2]$ and $[1~1]$, do not differ by a projective transformation.

=== Tilings ===
Tiling properties of the zonotope $Z$ are also closely related to the oriented matroid $\mathcal{M}$ associated to it. First we consider the space-tiling property. The zonotope $Z$ is said to tile $\mathbb{R}^d$ if there is a set of vectors $\Lambda \subset \mathbb{R}^d$ such that the union of all translates $Z + \lambda$ ($\lambda \in \Lambda$) is $\mathbb{R}^d$ and any two translates intersect in a (possibly empty) face of each. Such a zonotope is called a space-tiling zonotope. The following classification of space-tiling zonotopes is due to McMullen: The zonotope $Z$ generated by the vectors $V$ tiles space if and only if the corresponding oriented matroid is regular. So the seemingly geometric condition of being a space-tiling zonotope actually depends only on the combinatorial structure of the generating vectors.

== Dissections ==
Every d-dimensional zonotope generated by a finite set A of vectors can be partitioned into parallelepipeds, with one parallelepiped for each linearly independent subset of A. This yields another family of tilings associated to the zonotope $Z$, given by a zonotopal tiling of $Z$, i.e., a polyhedral complex with support $Z$: the union of all zonotopes in the collection is $Z$ and any two intersect in a common (possibly empty) face of each. The Bohne-Dress Theorem states that there is a bijection between zonotopal tilings of the zonotope $Z$ and single-element lifts of the oriented matroid $\mathcal{M}$ associated to $Z$.

== Volume ==
Zonotopes admit a simple analytic formula for their volume.

Let $Z(S)$ be the zonotope $Z = \{a_1 w_1 + \cdots + a_n w_n | \; \forall(j) a_j\in [0,1]\}$ generated by a set of vectors $S = \{w_1,\dots,w_n\in\mathbb{R}^d\}$. Then the d-dimensional volume of $Z(S)$ is given by

$$\sum_{T\subset S \; : \; |T| = d} |\det(Z(T))|$$

The determinant in this formula makes sense because (as noted above) when the set $T$ has cardinality equal to the dimension $n$ of the ambient space, the zonotope is a parallelotope.
