= Runcinated 5-cell =

Four-dimensional geometrical object

5-cell	Runcinated 5-cell
Runcitruncated 5-cell	Omnitruncated 5-cell (Runcicantitruncated 5-cell)
Orthogonal projections in A_{4} Coxeter plane

In four-dimensional geometry, a runcinated 5-cell is a convex uniform 4-polytope, being a runcination (a 3rd order truncation, up to face-planing) of the regular 5-cell.

There are 3 unique degrees of runcinations of the 5-cell, including with permutations, truncations, and cantellations.

== Runcinated 5-cell ==
Runcinated 5-cell
Schlegel diagram with half of the tetrahedral cells visible.
Type	Uniform 4-polytope	
Schläfli symbol	t_{0,3}{3,3,3}	
Coxeter diagram		
Cells	30	10 (3.3.3); 20 (3.4.4)
Faces	70	40 {3} 30 {4}
Edges	60	
Vertices	20	
Vertex figure	(Elongated equilateral-triangular antiprism)	
Symmetry group	Aut(A_{4}), [[3,3,3]], order 240	
Properties	convex, isogonal isotoxal	
Uniform index	4 5 6	

The runcinated 5-cell or small prismatodecachoron is constructed by expanding the cells of a 5-cell radially and filling in the gaps with triangular prisms (which are the face prisms and edge figures) and tetrahedra (cells of the dual 5-cell). It consists of 10 tetrahedra and 20 triangular prisms. The 10 tetrahedra correspond with the cells of a 5-cell and its dual.

Topologically, under its highest symmetry, [[3,3,3]], there is only one geometrical form, containing 10 tetrahedra and 20 uniform triangular prisms. The rectangles are always squares because the two pairs of edges correspond to the edges of the two sets of 5 regular tetrahedra each in dual orientation, which are made equal under extended symmetry.

E. L. Elte identified it in 1912 as a semiregular polytope.

=== Alternative names ===
- Runcinated 5-cell (Norman Johnson)
- Runcinated pentachoron
- Runcinated 4-simplex
- Expanded 5-cell/4-simplex/pentachoron
- Small prismatodecachoron (Acronym: Spid) (Jonathan Bowers)

=== Structure ===
Two of the ten tetrahedral cells meet at each vertex. The triangular prisms lie between them, joined to them by their triangular faces and to each other by their square faces. Each triangular prism is joined to its neighbouring triangular prisms in anti orientation (i.e., if edges A and B in the shared square face are joined to the triangular faces of one prism, then it is the other two edges that are joined to the triangular faces of the other prism); thus each pair of adjacent prisms, if rotated into the same hyperplane, would form a gyrobifastigium.

=== Configuration ===
Seen in a configuration matrix, all incidence counts between elements are shown. The diagonal f-vector numbers are derived through the Wythoff construction, dividing the full group order of a subgroup order by removing one mirror at a time.

f_{k}	f_{0}	f_{1}		f_{2}			f_{3}			
f_{0}	20	3	3	3	6	3	1	3	3	1
f_{1}	2	30	*	2	2	0	1	2	1	0
f_{1}	2	*	30	0	2	2	0	1	2	1
f_{2}	3	3	0	20	*	*	1	1	0	0
f_{2}	4	2	2	*	30	*	0	1	1	0
f_{2}	3	0	3	*	*	20	0	0	1	1
f_{3}	4	6	0	4	0	0	5	*	*	*
f_{3}	6	6	3	2	3	0	*	10	*	*
f_{3}	6	3	6	0	3	2	*	*	10	*
f_{3}	4	0	6	0	0	4	*	*	*	5

=== Dissection ===
The runcinated 5-cell can be dissected by a central cuboctahedron into two tetrahedral cupola. This dissection is analogous to the 3D cuboctahedron being dissected by a central hexagon into two triangular cupola.

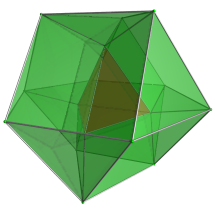

=== Images ===
Orthographic projections
A_{k} Coxeter plane	A_{4}	A_{3}	A_{2}
Graph			
Dihedral symmetry	[[5]] = [10]	[4]	[[3]] = [6]

View inside of a 3-sphere projection Schlegel diagram with its 10 tetrahedral cells	Net

=== Coordinates ===
The Cartesian coordinates of the vertices of an origin-centered runcinated 5-cell with edge length 2 are:

$$\pm\left(\sqrt{\frac{5}{2}},\ \frac{1}{\sqrt{6}},\  \frac{1}{\sqrt{3}},\  \pm1\right)$$ $$\pm\left(\sqrt{\frac{5}{2}},\ \frac{1}{\sqrt{6}},\  \frac{-2}{\sqrt{3}},\ 0\right)$$ $$\pm\left(\sqrt{\frac{5}{2}},\ -\sqrt{\frac{3}{2}},\ 0,\                   0\right)$$	$$\pm\left(0,\                  2\sqrt{\frac{2}{3}},\ \frac{1}{\sqrt{3}},\  \pm1\right)$$ $$\pm\left(0,\                  2\sqrt{\frac{2}{3}},\ \frac{-2}{\sqrt{3}},\ 0\right)$$ $$\left(0,\                  0,\                   \pm\sqrt{3},\         \pm1\right)$$ $$\left(0,\                  0,\                   0,\                   \pm2\right)$$

An alternate simpler set of coordinates can be made in 5-space, as 20 permutations of:

(0,1,1,1,2)

This construction exists as one of 32 orthant facets of the runcinated 5-orthoplex.

A second construction in 5-space, from the center of a rectified 5-orthoplex is given by coordinate permutations of:

(1,-1,0,0,0)

=== Root vectors ===
Its 20 vertices represent the root vectors of the simple Lie group A_{4}. It is also the vertex figure for the 5-cell honeycomb in 4-space.

=== Cross-sections ===
The maximal cross-section of the runcinated 5-cell with a 3-dimensional hyperplane is a cuboctahedron. This cross-section divides the runcinated 5-cell into two tetrahedral hypercupolae consisting of 5 tetrahedra and 10 triangular prisms each.

=== Projections ===
The tetrahedron-first orthographic projection of the runcinated 5-cell into 3-dimensional space has a cuboctahedral envelope. The structure of this projection is as follows:

- The cuboctahedral envelope is divided internally as follows:

- Four flattened tetrahedra join 4 of the triangular faces of the cuboctahedron to a central tetrahedron. These are the images of 5 of the tetrahedral cells.
- The 6 square faces of the cuboctahedron are joined to the edges of the central tetrahedron via distorted triangular prisms. These are the images of 6 of the triangular prism cells.
- The other 4 triangular faces are joined to the central tetrahedron via 4 triangular prisms (distorted by projection). These are the images of another 4 of the triangular prism cells.
- This accounts for half of the runcinated 5-cell (5 tetrahedra and 10 triangular prisms), which may be thought of as the 'northern hemisphere'.

- The other half, the 'southern hemisphere', corresponds to an isomorphic division of the cuboctahedron in dual orientation, in which the central tetrahedron is dual to the one in the first half. The triangular faces of the cuboctahedron join the triangular prisms in one hemisphere to the flattened tetrahedra in the other hemisphere, and vice versa. Thus, the southern hemisphere contains another 5 tetrahedra and another 10 triangular prisms, making the total of 10 tetrahedra and 20 triangular prisms.

=== Related skew polyhedron ===
The regular skew polyhedron, {4,6|3}, exists in 4-space with 6 squares around each vertex, in a zig-zagging nonplanar vertex figure. These square faces can be seen on the runcinated 5-cell, using all 60 edges and 20 vertices. The 40 triangular faces of the runcinated 5-cell can be seen as removed. The dual regular skew polyhedron, {6,4|3}, is similarly related to the hexagonal faces of the bitruncated 5-cell.

== Runcitruncated 5-cell ==
Runcitruncated 5-cell
Schlegel diagram with cuboctahedral cells shown
Type	Uniform 4-polytope	
Schläfli symbol	t_{0,1,3}{3,3,3}	
Coxeter diagram		
Cells	30	5 (3.6.6); 10 (4.4.6); 10 (3.4.4); 5 (3.4.3.4)
Faces	120	40 {3} 60 {4} 20 {6}
Edges	150	
Vertices	60	
Vertex figure	(Rectangular pyramid)	
Coxeter group	A_{4}, [3,3,3], order 120	
Properties	convex, isogonal	
Uniform index	7 8 9	

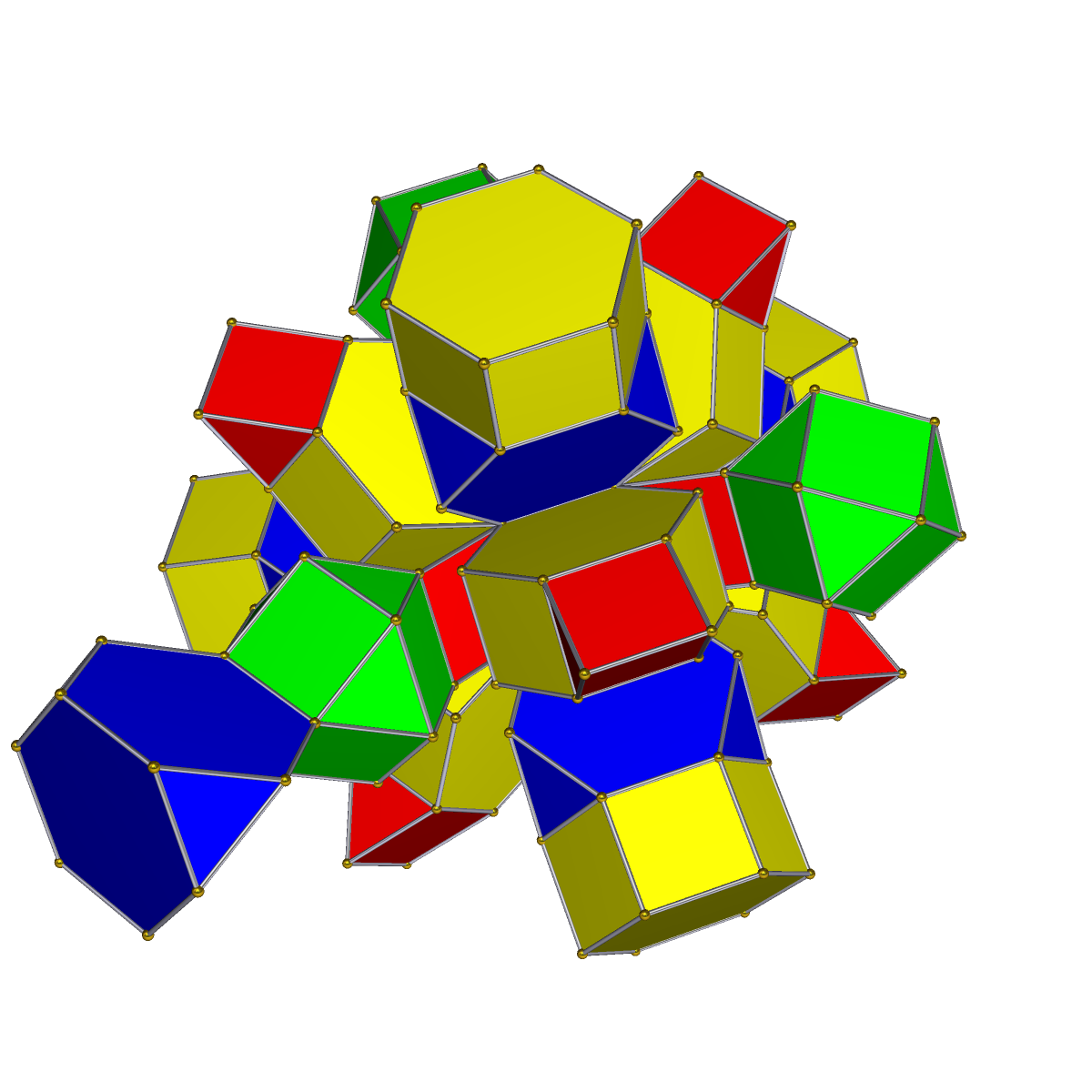
Net

The runcitruncated 5-cell or prismatorhombated pentachoron is composed of 60 vertices, 150 edges, 120 faces, and 30 cells. The cells are: 5 truncated tetrahedra, 10 hexagonal prisms, 10 triangular prisms, and 5 cuboctahedra. Each vertex is surrounded by five cells: one truncated tetrahedron, two hexagonal prisms, one triangular prism, and one cuboctahedron; the vertex figure is a rectangular pyramid.

=== Alternative names ===
- Runcitruncated pentachoron
- Runcitruncated 4-simplex
- Diprismatodispentachoron
- Prismatorhombated pentachoron (Acronym: prip) (Jonathan Bowers)

=== Configuration ===
Seen in a configuration matrix, all incidence counts between elements are shown. The diagonal f-vector numbers are derived through the Wythoff construction, dividing the full group order of a subgroup order by removing one mirror at a time.

f_{k}	f_{0}	f_{1}			f_{2}					f_{3}			
f_{0}	60	1	2	2	2	2	1	2	1	1	2	1	1
f_{1}	2	30	*	*	2	2	0	0	0	1	2	1	0
f_{1}	2	*	60	*	1	0	1	1	0	1	1	0	1
f_{1}	2	*	*	60	0	1	0	1	1	0	1	1	1
f_{2}	6	3	3	0	20	*	*	*	*	1	1	0	0
f_{2}	4	2	0	2	*	30	*	*	*	0	1	1	0
f_{2}	3	0	3	0	*	*	20	*	*	1	0	0	1
f_{2}	4	0	2	2	*	*	*	30	*	0	1	0	1
f_{2}	3	0	0	3	*	*	*	*	20	0	0	1	1
f_{3}	12	6	12	0	4	0	4	0	0	5	*	*	*
f_{3}	12	6	6	6	2	3	0	3	0	*	10	*	*
f_{3}	6	3	0	6	0	3	0	0	2	*	*	10	*
f_{3}	12	0	12	12	0	0	4	6	4	*	*	*	5

=== Images ===
Orthographic projections
A_{k} Coxeter plane	A_{4}	A_{3}	A_{2}
Graph			
Dihedral symmetry	[5]	[4]	[3]

Schlegel diagram with its 40 blue triangular faces and its 60 green quad faces.	Central part of Schlegel diagram.

=== Coordinates ===
The Cartesian coordinates of an origin-centered runcitruncated 5-cell having edge length 2 are:

Coordinates
$$\left(\frac{7}{\sqrt{10}},\ \sqrt{\frac{3}{2}},\    \pm\sqrt{3},\         \pm1\right)$$ $$\left(\frac{7}{\sqrt{10}},\ \sqrt{\frac{3}{2}},\    0,\                   \pm2\right)$$ $$\left(\frac{7}{\sqrt{10}},\ \frac{-1}{\sqrt{6}},\   \frac{2}{\sqrt{3}},\  \pm2\right)$$ $$\left(\frac{7}{\sqrt{10}},\ \frac{-1}{\sqrt{6}},\   \frac{-4}{\sqrt{3}},\ 0\right)$$ $$\left(\frac{7}{\sqrt{10}},\ \frac{-5}{\sqrt{6}},\   \frac{1}{\sqrt{3}},\  \pm1\right)$$ $$\left(\frac{7}{\sqrt{10}},\ \frac{-5}{\sqrt{6}},\   \frac{-2}{\sqrt{3}},\ 0\right)$$ $$\left(\sqrt{\frac{2}{5}},\  \pm\sqrt{6},\           \pm\sqrt{3},\         \pm1\right)$$ $$\left(\sqrt{\frac{2}{5}},\  \pm\sqrt{6},\           0,\                   \pm2\right)$$ $$\left(\sqrt{\frac{2}{5}},\  \sqrt{\frac{2}{3}},\    \frac{5}{\sqrt{3}},\  \pm1\right)$$	$$\left(\sqrt{\frac{2}{5}},\  \sqrt{\frac{2}{3}},\    \frac{-1}{\sqrt{3}},\ \pm3\right)$$ $$\left(\sqrt{\frac{2}{5}},\  \sqrt{\frac{2}{3}},\    \frac{-4}{\sqrt{3}},\ \pm2\right)$$ $$\left(\sqrt{\frac{2}{5}},\  -\sqrt{\frac{2}{3}},\   \frac{4}{\sqrt{3}},\  \pm2\right)$$ $$\left(\sqrt{\frac{2}{5}},\  -\sqrt{\frac{2}{3}},\   \frac{1}{\sqrt{3}},\  \pm3\right)$$ $$\left(\sqrt{\frac{2}{5}},\  -\sqrt{\frac{2}{3}},\   \frac{-5}{\sqrt{3}},\ \pm1\right)$$ $$\left(\frac{-3}{\sqrt{10}},\ \frac{5}{\sqrt{6}},\   \frac{2}{\sqrt{3}},\  \pm2\right)$$ $$\left(\frac{-3}{\sqrt{10}},\ \frac{5}{\sqrt{6}},\   \frac{-4}{\sqrt{3}},\ 0\right)$$ $$\left(\frac{-3}{\sqrt{10}},\ \frac{1}{\sqrt{6}},\   \frac{4}{\sqrt{3}},\  \pm2\right)$$ $$\left(\frac{-3}{\sqrt{10}},\ \frac{1}{\sqrt{6}},\   \frac{1}{\sqrt{3}},\  \pm3\right)$$	$$\left(\frac{-3}{\sqrt{10}},\ \frac{1}{\sqrt{6}},\   \frac{-5}{\sqrt{3}},\ \pm1\right)$$ $$\left(\frac{-3}{\sqrt{10}},\ \frac{-7}{\sqrt{6}},\  \frac{2}{\sqrt{3}},\  0\right)$$ $$\left(\frac{-3}{\sqrt{10}},\ \frac{-7}{\sqrt{6}},\  \frac{-1}{\sqrt{3}},\ \pm1\right)$$ $$\left(-4\sqrt{\frac{2}{5}},\ 2\sqrt{\frac{2}{3}},\  \frac{1}{\sqrt{3}},\  \pm1\right)$$ $$\left(-4\sqrt{\frac{2}{5}},\ 2\sqrt{\frac{2}{3}},\  \frac{-2}{\sqrt{3}},\ 0\right)$$ $$\left(-4\sqrt{\frac{2}{5}},\ 0,\                    \pm\sqrt{3},\         \pm1\right)$$ $$\left(-4\sqrt{\frac{2}{5}},\ 0,\                    0,\                   \pm2\right)$$ $$\left(-4\sqrt{\frac{2}{5}},\ -2\sqrt{\frac{2}{3}},\ \frac{2}{\sqrt{3}},\  0\right)$$ $$\left(-4\sqrt{\frac{2}{5}},\ -2\sqrt{\frac{2}{3}},\ \frac{-1}{\sqrt{3}},\ 1\right)$$

The vertices can be more simply constructed on a hyperplane in 5-space, as the permutations of:

(0,1,1,2,3)

This construction is from the positive orthant facet of the runcitruncated 5-orthoplex.

== Omnitruncated 5-cell ==
Omnitruncated 5-cell
Schlegel diagram with half of the truncated octahedral cells shown.
Type	Uniform 4-polytope	
Schläfli symbol	t_{0,1,2,3}{3,3,3}	
Coxeter diagram		
Cells	30	10 (4.6.6); 20 (4.4.6)
Faces	150	90{4} 60{6}
Edges	240	
Vertices	120	
Vertex figure	Phyllic disphenoid	
Coxeter group	Aut(A_{4}), [[3,3,3]], order 240	
Properties	convex, isogonal, zonotope	
Uniform index	8 9 10	

The omnitruncated 5-cell or great prismatodecachoron is composed of 120 vertices, 240 edges, 150 faces (90 squares and 60 hexagons), and 30 cells. The cells are: 10 truncated octahedra, and 20 hexagonal prisms. Each vertex is surrounded by four cells: two truncated octahedra, and two hexagonal prisms, arranged in two phyllic disphenoidal vertex figures.

Coxeter calls this Hinton's polytope after C. H. Hinton, who described it in his book The Fourth Dimension in 1906. It forms a uniform honeycomb which Coxeter calls Hinton's honeycomb.

=== Alternative names ===
- Omnitruncated 5-cell
- Omnitruncated pentachoron
- Omnitruncated 4-simplex
- Great prismatodecachoron (Acronym: gippid) (Jonathan Bowers)
- Hinton's polytope (Coxeter)

=== Configuration ===
Seen in a configuration matrix, all incidence counts between elements are shown. The diagonal f-vector numbers are derived through the Wythoff construction, dividing the full group order of a subgroup order by removing one mirror at a time.

f_{k}	f_{0}	f_{1}				f_{2}						f_{3}			
f_{0}	120	1	1	1	1	1	1	1	1	1	1	1	1	1	1
f_{1}	2	60	*	*	*	1	1	1	0	0	0	1	1	1	0
f_{1}	2	*	60	*	*	1	0	0	1	1	0	1	1	0	1
f_{1}	2	*	*	60	*	0	1	0	1	0	1	1	0	1	1
f_{1}	2	*	*	*	60	0	0	1	0	1	1	0	1	1	1
f_{2}	6	3	3	0	0	20	*	*	*	*	*	1	1	0	0
f_{2}	4	2	0	2	0	*	30	*	*	*	*	1	0	1	0
f_{2}	4	2	0	0	2	*	*	30	*	*	*	0	1	1	0
f_{2}	6	0	3	3	0	*	*	*	20	*	*	1	0	0	1
f_{2}	4	0	2	0	2	*	*	*	*	30	*	0	1	0	1
f_{2}	6	0	0	3	3	*	*	*	*	*	20	0	0	1	1
f_{3}	24	12	12	12	0	4	6	0	4	0	0	5	*	*	*
f_{3}	12	6	6	0	6	2	0	3	0	3	0	*	10	*	*
f_{3}	12	6	0	6	6	0	3	3	0	0	2	*	*	10	*
f_{3}	24	0	12	12	12	0	0	0	4	6	4	*	*	*	5

=== Images ===
Orthographic projections
A_{k} Coxeter plane	A_{4}	A_{3}	A_{2}
Graph			
Dihedral symmetry	[[5]] = [10]	[4]	[[3]] = [6]

Net
Omnitruncated 5-cell	Dual to omnitruncated 5-cell

=== Perspective projections ===
Perspective Schlegel diagram Centered on truncated octahedron	Stereographic projection

=== Permutohedron ===
Just as the truncated octahedron is the permutohedron of order 4, the omnitruncated 5-cell is the permutohedron of order 5. The omnitruncated 5-cell is a zonotope, the Minkowski sum of five line segments parallel to the five lines through the origin and the five vertices of the 5-cell.

Orthogonal projection as a permutohedron

=== Tessellations ===
The omnitruncated 5-cell honeycomb can tessellate 4-dimensional space by translational copies of this cell, each with 3 hypercells around each face. This honeycomb's Coxeter diagram is. Unlike the analogous honeycomb in three dimensions, the bitruncated cubic honeycomb which has three different Coxeter group Wythoff constructions, this honeycomb has only one such construction.

=== Symmetry ===
The omnitruncated 5-cell has extended pentachoric symmetry, [[3,3,3]], order 240. The vertex figure of the omnitruncated 5-cell represents the Goursat tetrahedron of the [3,3,3] Coxeter group. The extended symmetry comes from a 2-fold rotation across the middle order-3 branch, and is represented more explicitly as [2^{+}[3,3,3]].

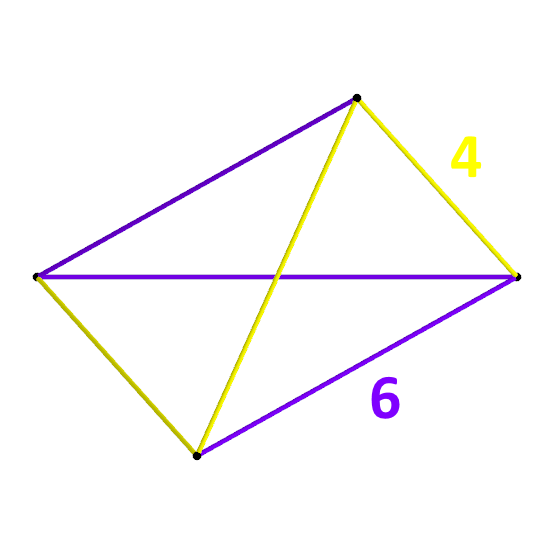

=== Coordinates ===
The Cartesian coordinates of the vertices of an origin-centered omnitruncated 5-cell having edge length 2 are:

$$\left(\pm\sqrt{10},\ \pm\sqrt{6},\ \pm\sqrt{3},\ \pm1\right)$$ $$\left(\pm\sqrt{10},\ \pm\sqrt{6},\ 0,\ \pm2\right)$$ $$\pm\left(\pm\sqrt{10},\ \sqrt{\frac{2}{3}},\ \frac{5}{\sqrt{3}},\ \pm1\right)$$ $$\pm\left(\pm\sqrt{10},\ \sqrt{\frac{2}{3}},\ \frac{-1}{\sqrt{3}},\ \pm3\right)$$ $$\pm\left(\pm\sqrt{10},\ \sqrt{\frac{2}{3}},\ \frac{-4}{\sqrt{3}},\ \pm2\right)$$ $$\left(\sqrt{\frac{5}{2}},\ 3\sqrt{\frac{3}{2}},\ \pm\sqrt{3},\ \pm1\right)$$ $$\left(-\sqrt{\frac{5}{2}},\ -3\sqrt{\frac{3}{2}},\ \pm\sqrt{3},\ \pm1\right)$$ $$\left(\sqrt{\frac{5}{2}},\ 3\sqrt{\frac{3}{2}},\ 0,\ \pm2\right)$$ $$\left(-\sqrt{\frac{5}{2}},\ -3\sqrt{\frac{3}{2}},\ 0,\ \pm2\right)$$	$$\pm\left(\sqrt{\frac{5}{2}},\ \frac{1}{\sqrt{6}},\ \frac{7}{\sqrt{3}},\ \pm1\right)$$ $$\pm\left(\sqrt{\frac{5}{2}},\ \frac{1}{\sqrt{6}},\ \frac{-2}{\sqrt{3}},\ \pm4\right)$$ $$\pm\left(\sqrt{\frac{5}{2}},\ \frac{1}{\sqrt{6}},\ \frac{-5}{\sqrt{3}},\ \pm3\right)$$ $$\pm\left(\sqrt{\frac{5}{2}},\ -\sqrt{\frac{3}{2}},\ \pm2\sqrt{3},\ \pm2\right)$$ $$\pm\left(\sqrt{\frac{5}{2}},\ -\sqrt{\frac{3}{2}},\ 0,\ \pm4\right)$$ $$\pm\left(\sqrt{\frac{5}{2}},\ \frac{-7}{\sqrt{6}},\ \frac{5}{\sqrt{3}},\ \pm1\right)$$ $$\pm\left(\sqrt{\frac{5}{2}},\ \frac{-7}{\sqrt{6}},\ \frac{-1}{\sqrt{3}},\ \pm3\right)$$	$$\pm\left(\sqrt{\frac{5}{2}},\ \frac{-7}{\sqrt{6}},\ \frac{-4}{\sqrt{3}},\ \pm2\right)$$ $$\pm\left(0,\ 4\sqrt{\frac{2}{3}},\ \frac{5}{\sqrt{3}},\ \pm1\right)$$ $$\pm\left(0,\ 4\sqrt{\frac{2}{3}},\ \frac{-1}{\sqrt{3}},\ \pm3\right)$$ $$\pm\left(0,\ 4\sqrt{\frac{2}{3}},\ \frac{-4}{\sqrt{3}},\ \pm2\right)$$ $$\pm\left(0,\ 2\sqrt{\frac{2}{3}},\ \frac{7}{\sqrt{3}},\ \pm1\right)$$ $$\pm\left(0,\ 2\sqrt{\frac{2}{3}},\ \frac{-2}{\sqrt{3}},\ \pm4\right)$$ $$\pm\left(0,\ 2\sqrt{\frac{2}{3}},\ \frac{-5}{\sqrt{3}},\ \pm3\right)$$

These vertices can be more simply obtained in 5-space as the 120 permutations of (0,1,2,3,4). This construction is from the positive orthant facet of the runcicantitruncated 5-orthoplex, t_{0,1,2,3}{3,3,3,4},.

=== Related polytopes ===
Nonuniform variants with [3,3,3] symmetry and two types of truncated octahedra can be doubled by placing the two types of truncated octahedra on each other to produce a nonuniform polychoron with 10 truncated octahedra, two types of 40 hexagonal prisms (20 ditrigonal prisms and 20 ditrigonal trapezoprisms), two kinds of 90 rectangular trapezoprisms (30 with D_{2d} symmetry and 60 with C_{2v} symmetry), and 240 vertices. Its vertex figure is an irregular triangular bipyramid.

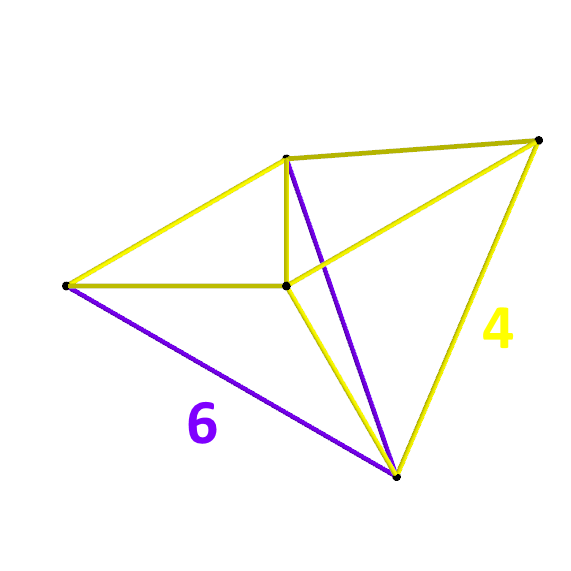
Vertex figure

This polychoron can then be alternated to produce another nonuniform polychoron with 10 icosahedra, two types of 40 octahedra (20 with S_{6} symmetry and 20 with D_{3} symmetry), three kinds of 210 tetrahedra (30 tetragonal disphenoids, 60 phyllic disphenoids, and 120 irregular tetrahedra), and 120 vertices. It has a symmetry of [[3,3,3]^{+}], order 120.

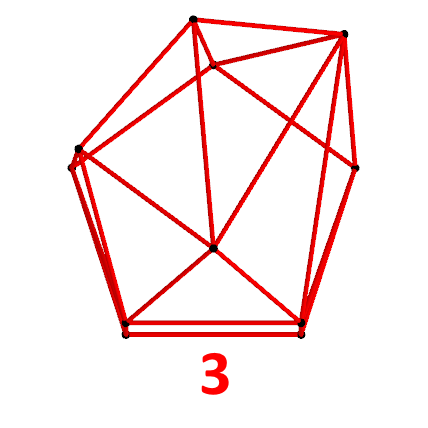
Vertex figure

=== Full snub 5-cell ===
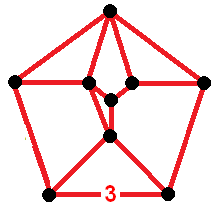
Vertex figure for the omnisnub 5-cell

The full snub 5-cell or omnisnub 5-cell, defined as an alternation of the omnitruncated 5-cell, cannot be made uniform, but it can be given Coxeter diagram, and symmetry [[3,3,3]]^{+}, order 120, and constructed from 90 cells: 10 icosahedrons, 20 octahedrons, and 60 tetrahedrons filling the gaps at the deleted vertices. It has 300 faces (triangles), 270 edges, and 60 vertices.

Topologically, under its highest symmetry, [[3,3,3]]^{+}, the 10 icosahedra have T (chiral tetrahedral) symmetry, while the 20 octahedra have D_{3} symmetry and the 60 tetrahedra have C_{2} symmetry.

== Related polytopes ==
These polytopes are a part of a family of 9 Uniform 4-polytope constructed from the [3,3,3] Coxeter group.

Name	5-cell	truncated 5-cell	rectified 5-cell	cantellated 5-cell	bitruncated 5-cell	cantitruncated 5-cell	runcinated 5-cell	runcitruncated 5-cell	omnitruncated 5-cell
Schläfli symbol	{3,3,3} 3r{3,3,3}	t{3,3,3} 3t{3,3,3}	r{3,3,3} 2r{3,3,3}	rr{3,3,3} r2r{3,3,3}	2t{3,3,3}	tr{3,3,3} t2r{3,3,3}	t_{0,3}{3,3,3}	t_{0,1,3}{3,3,3} t_{0,2,3}{3,3,3}	t_{0,1,2,3}{3,3,3}
Coxeter diagram									
Schlegel diagram									
A_{4} Coxeter plane Graph									
A_{3} Coxeter plane Graph									
A_{2} Coxeter plane Graph									

== Notes ==
Fundamental convex regular and uniform polytopes in dimensions 2–10
Family	A_{n}	B_{n}	I_{2}(p) / D_{n}	E_{6} / E_{7} / E_{8} / F_{4} / G_{2}	H_{n}
Regular polygon	Triangle	Square	p-gon	Hexagon	Pentagon
Uniform polyhedron	Tetrahedron	Octahedron • Cube	Demicube		Dodecahedron • Icosahedron
Uniform polychoron	Pentachoron	16-cell • Tesseract	Demitesseract	24-cell	120-cell • 600-cell
Uniform 5-polytope	5-simplex	5-orthoplex • 5-cube	5-demicube		
Uniform 6-polytope	6-simplex	6-orthoplex • 6-cube	6-demicube	1_{22} • 2_{21}	
Uniform 7-polytope	7-simplex	7-orthoplex • 7-cube	7-demicube	1_{32} • 2_{31} • 3_{21}	
Uniform 8-polytope	8-simplex	8-orthoplex • 8-cube	8-demicube	1_{42} • 2_{41} • 4_{21}	
Uniform 9-polytope	9-simplex	9-orthoplex • 9-cube	9-demicube		
Uniform 10-polytope	10-simplex	10-orthoplex • 10-cube	10-demicube		
Uniform n-polytope	n-simplex	n-orthoplex • n-cube	n-demicube	1_{k2} • 2_{k1} • k_{21}	n-pentagonal polytope
Topics: Polytope families • Regular polytope • List of regular polytopes and compounds • Polytope operations
