= Tetrahedral cupola =

Tetrahedral cupola
Schlegel diagram
Type	Polyhedral cupola	
Schläfli symbol	{3,3} v rr{3,3}	
Cells	16	1 rr{3,3} 1+4 {3,3} 4+6 {}×{3}
Faces	42	24 triangles 18 squares
Edges	42	
Vertices	16	
Dual		
Symmetry group	[3,3,1], order 24	
Properties	convex, regular-faced	

In 4-dimensional geometry, the tetrahedral cupola is a polychoron bounded by one tetrahedron, a parallel cuboctahedron, connected by 10 triangular prisms, and 4 triangular pyramids.

== Related polytopes ==
The tetrahedral cupola can be sliced off from a runcinated 5-cell, on a hyperplane parallel to a tetrahedral cell. The cuboctahedron base passes through the center of the runcinated 5-cell, so the Tetrahedral cupola contains half of the tetrahedron and triangular prism cells of the runcinated 5-cell. The cupola can be seen in A_{2} and A_{3} Coxeter plane orthogonal projection of the runcinated 5-cell:

A_{3} Coxeter plane
Runcinated 5-cell	Tetrahedron (Cupola top)	Cuboctahedron (Cupola base)
A_{2} Coxeter plane

== See also ==
- Tetrahedral pyramid (5-cell)
