= Sound Catcher =

Wooden structure in Lithuania

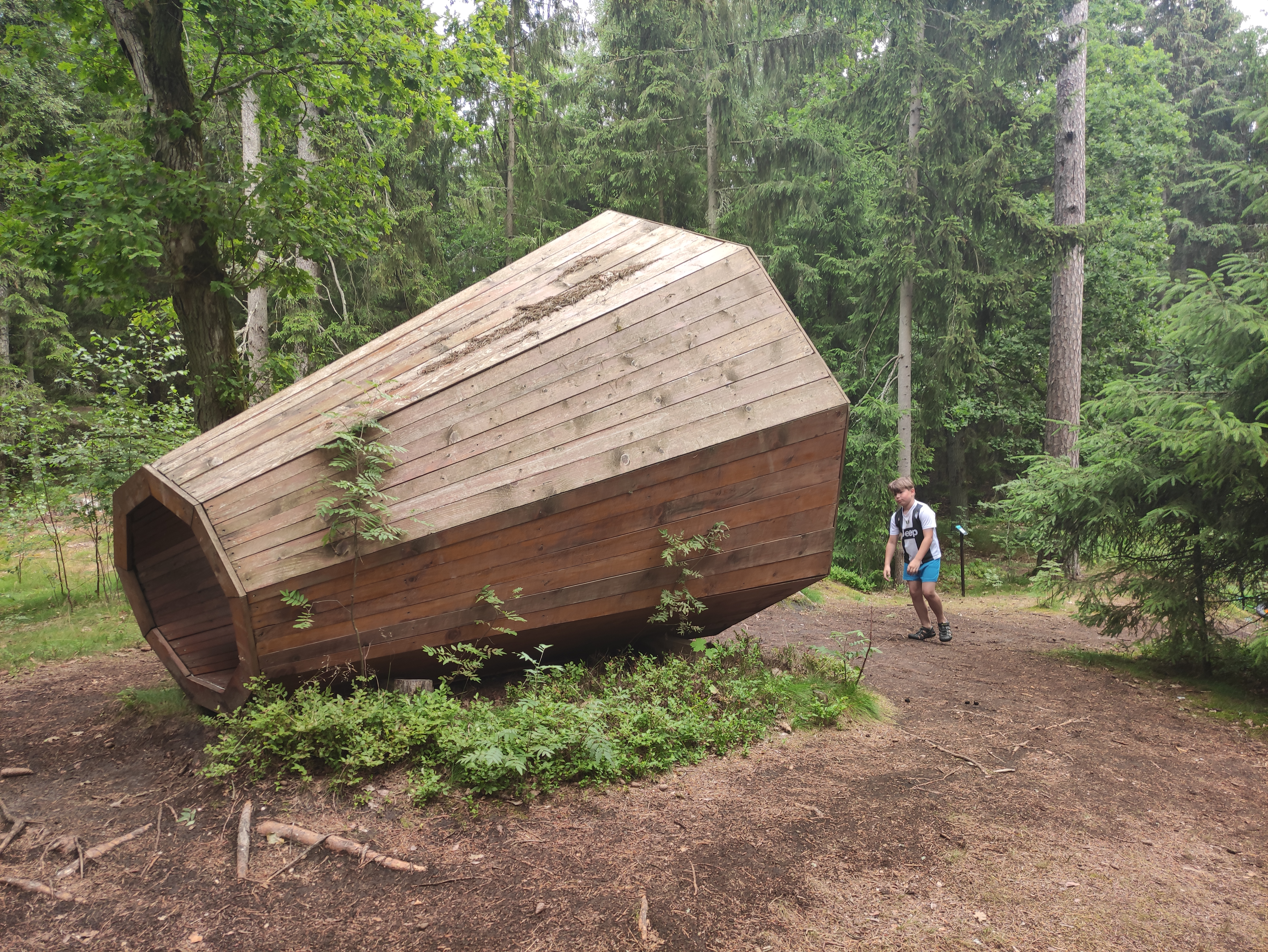
- Medium: Wood
- Location: 93102 Neringa Municipality, Lithuania; 55.5549°N 21.1217°E

The Sound Catcher (Garsų Gaudyklė) is a wooden sculpture located in the Curonian Spit National Park in Klaipėda County, Lithuania. It was created in 2016.

The Sound Catcher is a unique wooden work, which resembles a large gramophone in shape. It is a shell in the shape of a hollow truncated pyramid with a height and width of 3 m (9 3/4 ft) and a nine-sided base, and one can enter the inner part. The work uses acoustics, both the natural forest sounds of the surroundings, which it amplifies, or visitors can use the information stand with QR codes with sound recordings for mobile phones.

== Gallery ==
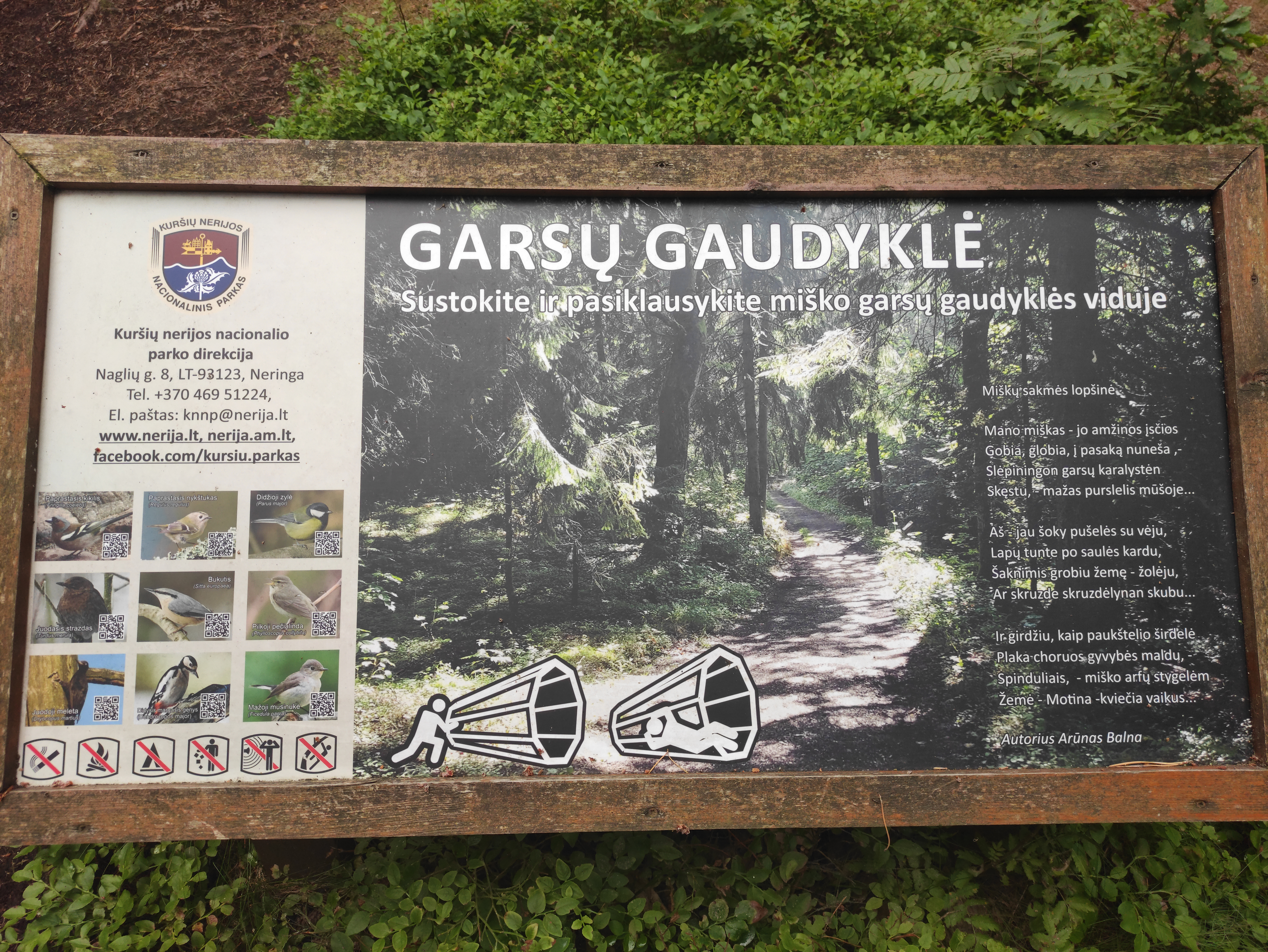

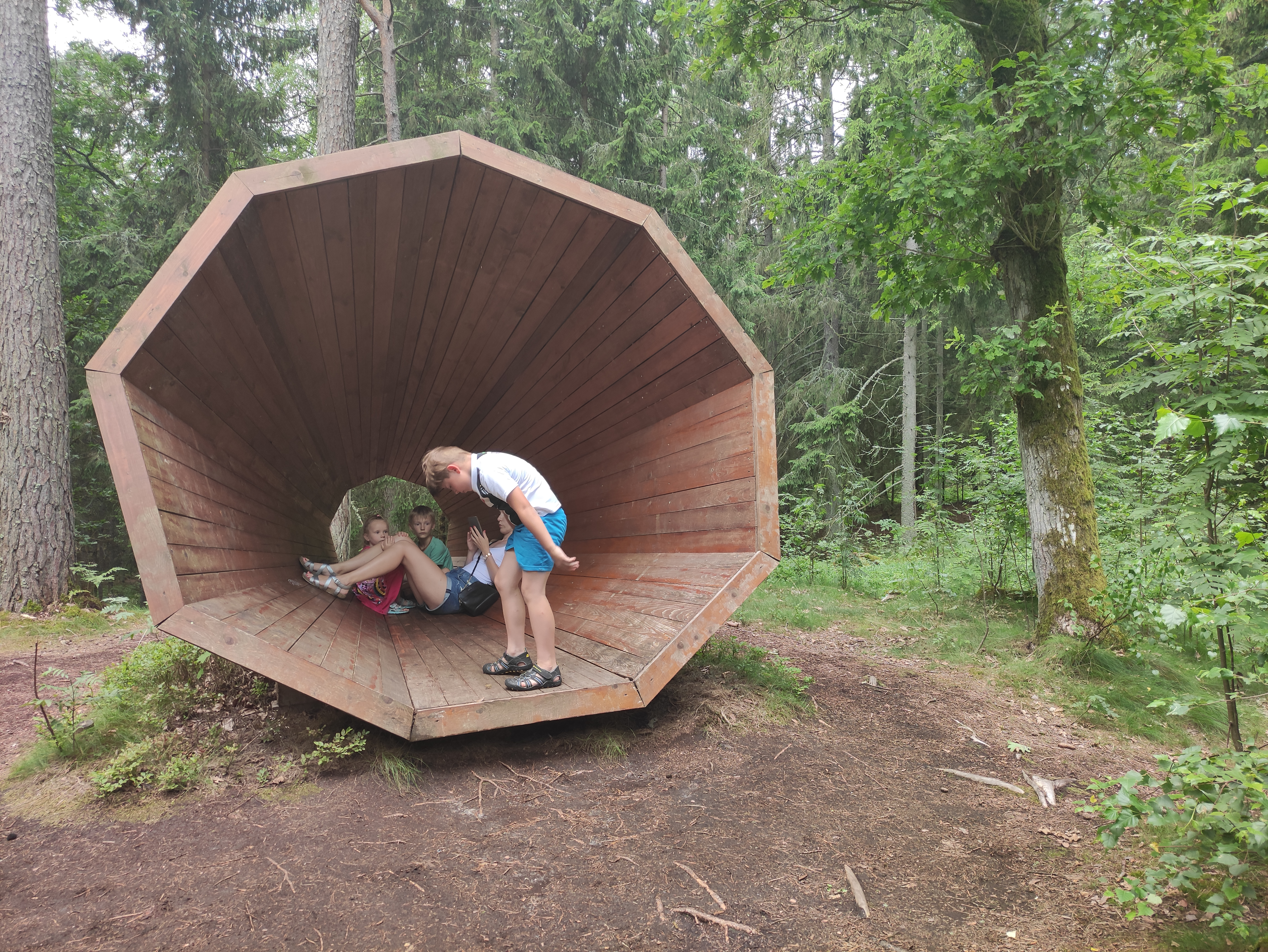
