= Nonagon =

Shape with nine sides

Regular enneagon (nonagon)
- A regular enneagon (nonagon)
- Type: Regular polygon
- Edges and vertices: 9
- Schläfli symbol: {9}
- Symmetry group: Dihedral (D_{9}), order 2×9
- Internal angle (degrees): 140°
- Properties: Convex, cyclic, equilateral, isogonal, isotoxal
- Dual polygon: Self

In geometry, a nonagon (/ˈnɒnəɡɒn/) or enneagon (/ˈɛniəɡɒn/) is a nine-sided polygon or 9-gon. The total sum of a simple nonagon's interior angles is 1260°.

The name nonagon is a prefix hybrid formation, from Latin (nonus, "ninth" + gonon), used equivalently, attested already in the 16th century in French nonogone and in English from the 17th century. The name enneagon comes from Greek enneagonon (εννεα, "nine" + γωνον (from γωνία = "corner")), and is arguably more correct, though less common.

== Regular nonagon ==
A regular nonagon is represented by Schläfli symbol {9} and has internal angles of 140°. The area of a regular nonagon of side length a is given by

$A = \frac{9}{4}a^2\cot\frac{\pi}{9}=(9/2)ar = 9r^2\tan(\pi/9)$

$$= (9/2)R^2\sin(2\pi/9)\simeq6.18182\,a^2,$$

where the radius r of the inscribed circle of the regular nonagon is

$$r=(a/2)\cot(\pi/9)$$

and where R is the radius of its circumscribed circle:

$$R = \sqrt{(a/2)^2 + r^2 }=r\sec(\pi/9)=(a/2)\csc(\pi/9).$$

== Construction ==
Although a regular nonagon is not constructible with compass and straightedge (as 9 = 3^{2}, which is not a product of distinct Fermat primes), there are very old methods of construction that produce very close approximations.

It can be also constructed using neusis, or by allowing the use of an angle trisector.

Nonagon, an animation from a neusis construction based on the angle trisection 120° by means of the Tomahawk, at the end 10 s break

Nonagon, a neusis construction based on a hexagon with trisection of the angle according to Archimedes

== Symmetry ==
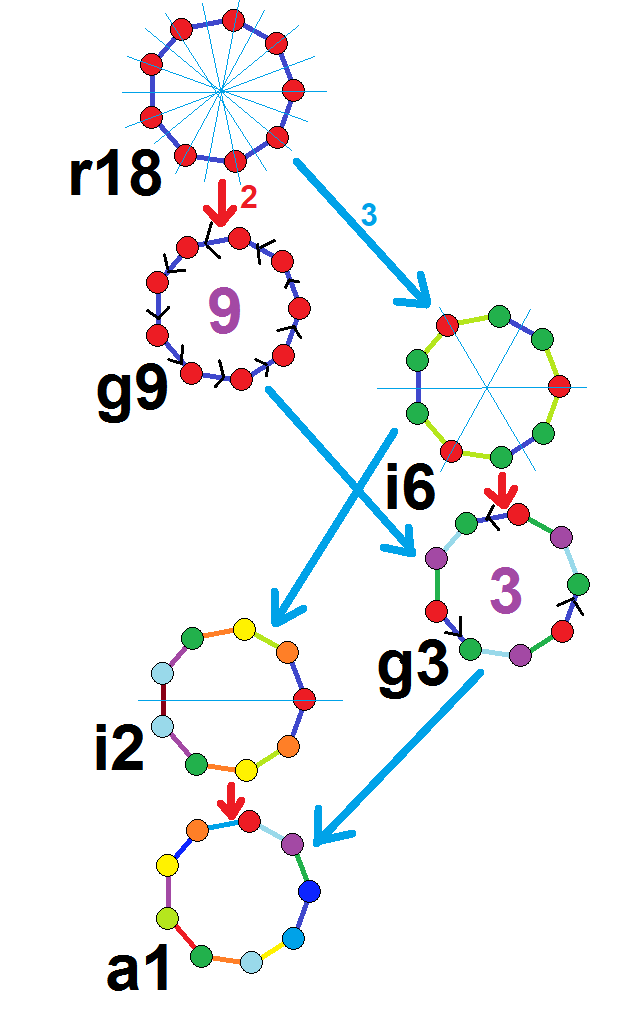
Symmetries of a regular enneagon. Vertices are colored by their symmetry positions. Blue mirrors are drawn through vertices, and purple mirrors are drawn through edge. Gyration orders are given in the center.

The regular enneagon has Dih_{9} symmetry, order 18. There are 2 subgroup dihedral symmetries: Dih_{3} and Dih_{1}, and 3 cyclic group symmetries: Z_{9}, Z_{3}, and Z_{1}.

These 6 symmetries can be seen in 6 distinct symmetries on the enneagon. John Conway labels these by a letter and group order. Full symmetry of the regular form is r18 and no symmetry is labeled a1. The dihedral symmetries are divided depending on whether they pass through vertices (d for diagonal) or edges (p for perpendiculars), and i when reflection lines path through both edges and vertices. Cyclic symmetries in the middle column are labeled as g for their central gyration orders.

Each subgroup symmetry allows one or more degrees of freedom for irregular forms. Only the g9 subgroup has no degrees of freedom but can be seen as directed edges.

== Tilings ==
The regular enneagon can tessellate the euclidean tiling with gaps. These gaps can be filled with regular hexagons and isosceles triangles. In the notation of symmetrohedron this tiling is called H(*;3;*;[2]) with H representing *632 hexagonal symmetry in the plane.

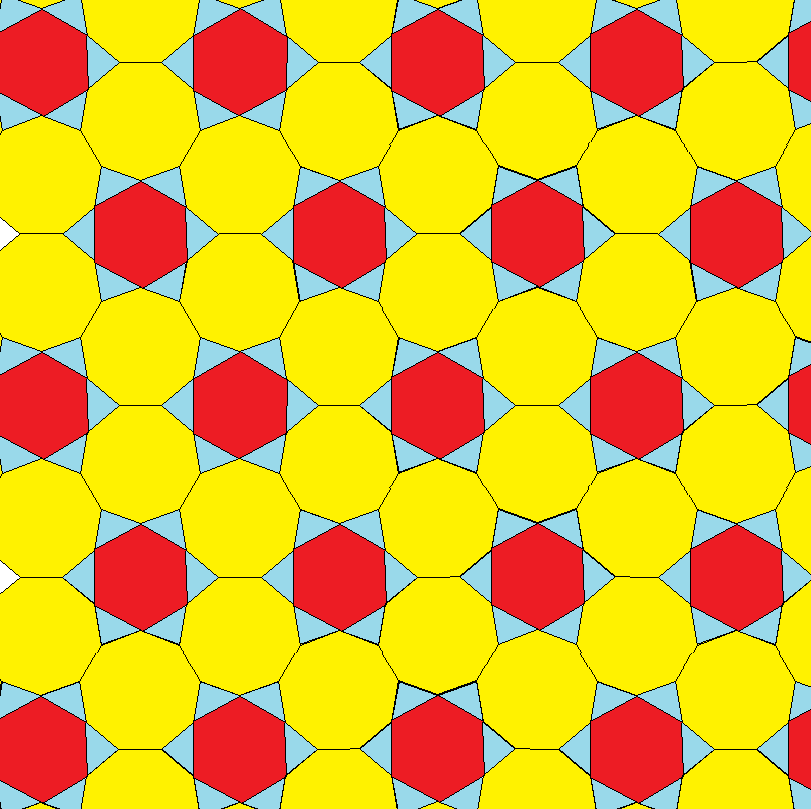

== Graphs ==
The K_{9} complete graph is often drawn as a regular enneagon with all 36 edges connected. This graph also represents an orthographic projection of the 9 vertices and 36 edges of the 8-simplex.

8-simplex (8D)

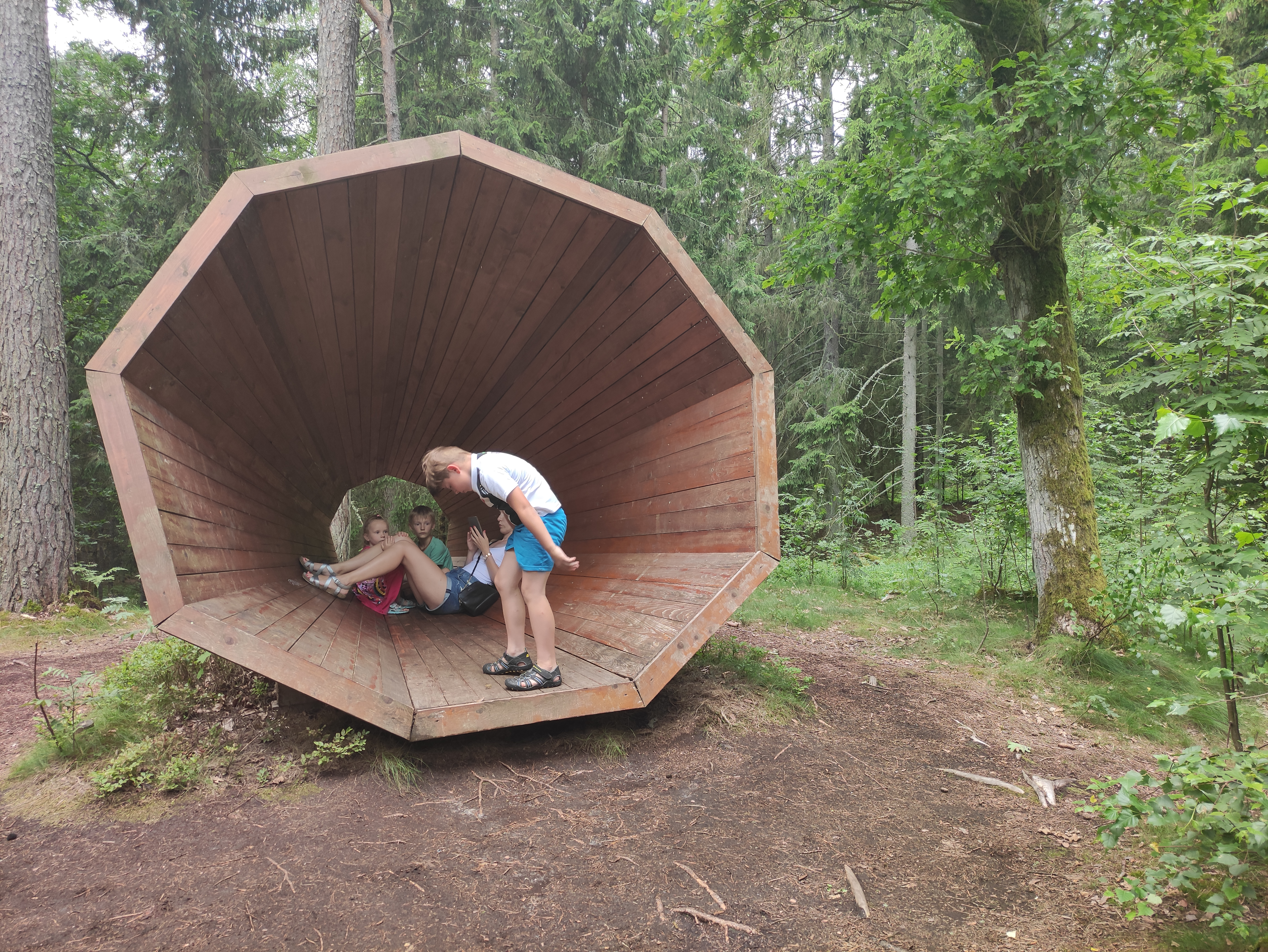
Sound Catcher in Lithuania

== Architecture ==
Temples of the Baháʼí Faith, called Baháʼí Houses of Worship, are required to be nonagonal.

The U.S. Steel Tower is an irregular nonagon.

The Sound Catcher, a wooden structure in a Lithuanian forest, is also nine-sided.

Palmanova in Italy is in the shape of a nonagon.

== In popular culture ==
- They Might Be Giants have a song titled "Nonagon" on their children's album Here Come the 123s. It refers to both an attendee at a party at which "everybody at the party is a many-sided polygon", as well as a dance that the polygons perform at this party.
- Slipknot's logo is also a version of a nonagon, being a nine-pointed star made of three triangles, referring to the nine members.
- King Gizzard & the Lizard Wizard have an album titled Nonagon Infinity, the album art featuring a nonagonal complete graph. The album consists of nine songs and repeats cyclically.

== See also ==
- Enneagram (nonagram)
- Trisection of the angle 60°, Proximity construction
