= Cupola (geometry) =

Solid made by joining an n- and 2n-gon with triangles and squares

Set of cupolae
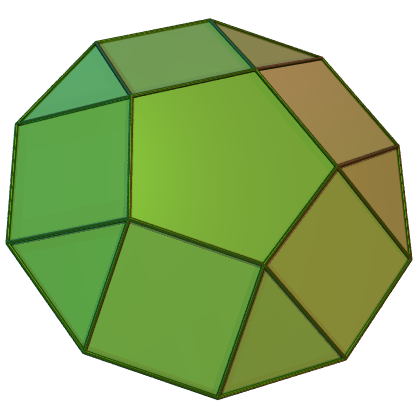
- Pentagonal example
- Faces: n triangles, n squares, 1 n-gon, 1 2n-gon
- Edges: 5n
- Vertices: 3n
- Schläfli symbol: {n} || t{n}
- Symmetry group: C_{nv}, [1,n], (*nn), order 2n
- Rotation group: C_{n}, [1,n]^{+}, (nn), order n
- Dual polyhedron: Semibisected trapezohedron
- Properties: convex, prismatoid

In geometry, a cupola (plural: cupolae) is a solid formed by joining two polygons, one (the base) with twice as many edges as the other, by an alternating band of isosceles triangles and rectangles. If the triangles are equilateral and the rectangles are squares, while the base and its opposite face are regular polygons, the triangular, square, and pentagonal cupolae all count among the Johnson solids, and can be formed by taking sections of the cuboctahedron, rhombicuboctahedron, and rhombicosidodecahedron, respectively. Cupolae are a subclass of the prismatoids.

A cupola can also be seen as a prism where one of the polygons has been collapsed in half by merging alternate vertices.

A cupola can be given an extended Schläfli symbol {n} || t{n}, representing a regular polygon {n} joined by a parallel of its truncation, t{n} or {2n}.

The dual of a cupola contains a shape that is sort of a weld between half of an n-sided trapezohedron and a 2n-sided pyramid.

== Examples ==
Family of convex cupolae
n	2	3	4	5	6	7	8
Schläfli symbol	{2} || t{2}	{3} || t{3}	{4} || t{4}	{5} || t{5}	{6} || t{6}	{7} || t{7}	{8} || t{8}
Cupola	Digonal cupola	Triangular cupola	Square cupola	Pentagonal cupola	Hexagonal cupola (Flat)	Heptagonal cupola (Non-regular face)	Octagonal cupola (Non-regular face)
Related uniform polyhedra	Rhombohedron	Cuboctahedron	Rhombicuboctahedron	Rhombicosidodecahedron	Rhombitrihexagonal tiling	Rhombitriheptagonal tiling	Rhombitrioctagonal tiling

Plane "hexagonal cupolae" in the rhombitrihexagonal tiling

The triangular, square, and pentagonal cupolae are the only non-trivial convex cupolae with regular faces: The "hexagonal cupola" is a plane figure, and the triangular prism might be considered a "cupola" of degree 2 (the cupola of a line segment and a square). However, cupolae of higher-degree polygons may be constructed with irregular triangular and rectangular faces.

== Coordinates of the vertices ==
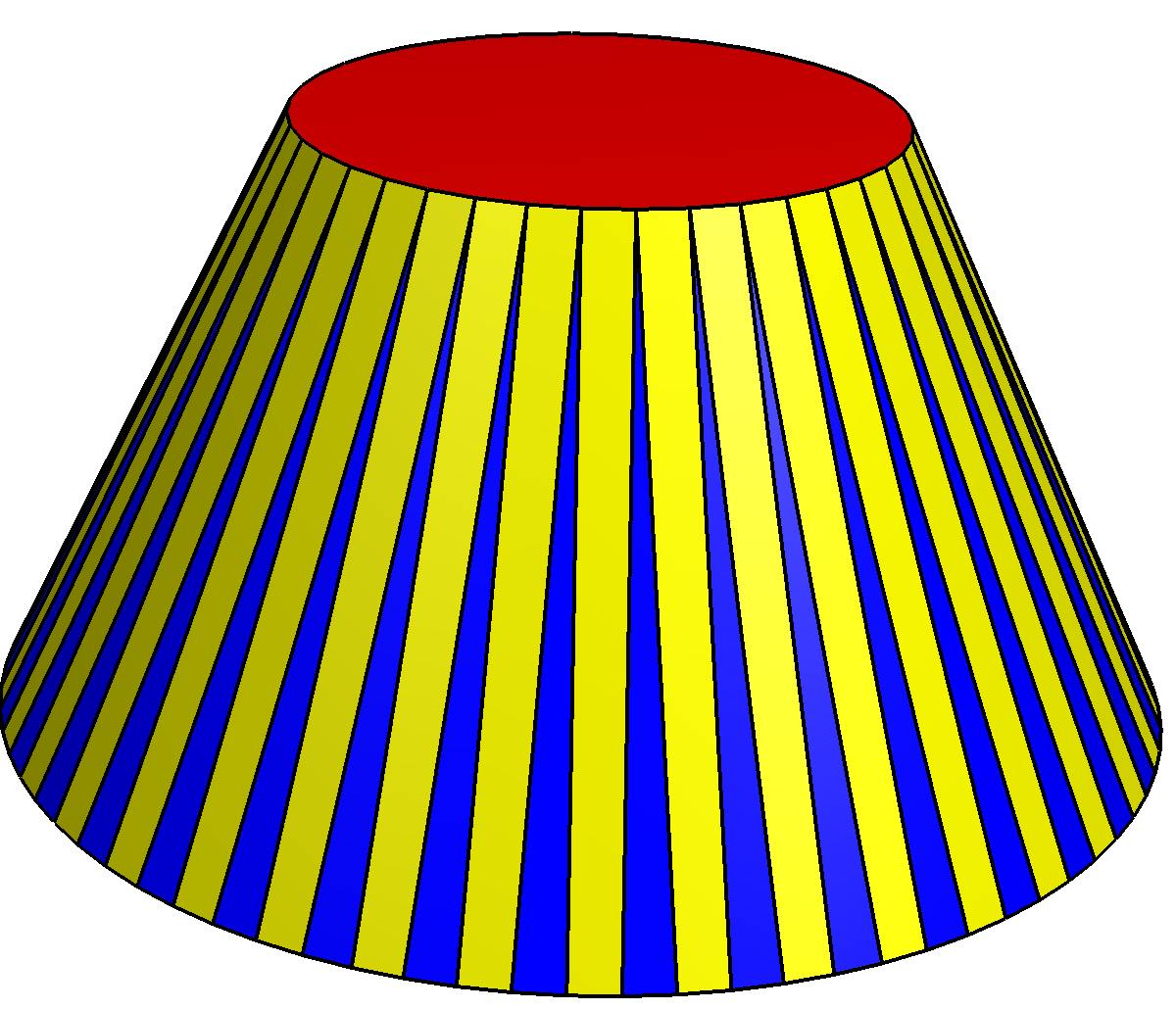
A tetracontagonal cupola has: 40 isosceles triangles; 40 rectangles; A top regular tetracontagon; and a bottom regular octacontagon (hidden).

The definition of the cupola does not require the base (or the side opposite the base, which can be called the top) to be a regular polygon, but it is convenient to consider the case where the cupola has its maximal symmetry, C_{nv}. In that case, the top is a regular n-gon, while the base is either a regular 2n-gon or a 2n-gon which has two different side lengths alternating and the same angles as a regular 2n-gon. It is convenient to fix the coordinate system so that the base lies in the xy-plane, with the top in a plane parallel to the xy-plane. The z-axis is the n-fold axis, and the mirror planes pass through the z-axis and bisect the sides of the base. They also either bisect the sides or the angles of the top polygon, or both. (If n is even, half of the mirror planes bisect the sides of the top polygon and half bisect the angles, while if n is odd, each mirror plane bisects one side and one angle of the top polygon.) The vertices of the base can be designated $V_1$ through $V_{2n},$ while the vertices of the top polygon can be designated $V_{2n+1}$ through $V_{3n}.$ With these conventions, the coordinates of the vertices can be written as:
$$\begin{array}{rllcc}
V_{2j-1} :& \biggl( r_b \cos\left(\frac{2\pi(j-1)}{n} + \alpha\right), & r_b \sin\left(\frac{2\pi(j-1)}{n} + \alpha\right), & 0 \biggr) \\[2pt]
V_{2j} :& \biggl( r_b \cos\left(\frac{2\pi j}{n} - \alpha\right), & r_b \sin\left(\frac{2\pi j}{n} - \alpha\right), & 0 \biggr) \\[2pt]
V_{2n+j} :& \biggl( r_t \cos\frac{\pi j}{n}, & r_t \sin\frac{\pi j}{n}, & h \biggr)
\end{array}$$

for j = 1, 2, ..., n.

Since the polygons $V_1 V_ 2 V_{2n+2} V_{2n+1},$ etc. are rectangles, this puts a constraint on the values of $r_b, r_t, \alpha.$ The distance $\bigl|V_1 V_2 \bigr|$ is equal to
$$\begin{align}
& r_b \sqrt{ \left[\cos\left(\tfrac{2\pi}{n} - \alpha\right) - \cos \alpha\right]^2 + \left[\sin\left(\tfrac{2\pi}{n} - \alpha\right) - \sin\alpha\right]^2} \\[5pt]
=\ & r_b \sqrt{ \left[\cos^2 \left(\tfrac{2\pi}{n} - \alpha\right) - 2\cos\left(\tfrac{2pi}{n} - \alpha\right)\cos\alpha + \cos^2 \alpha \right] + \left[\sin^2 \left(\tfrac{2\pi}{n} - \alpha\right) - 2\sin\left(\tfrac{2\pi}{n} - \alpha\right) \sin\alpha + \sin^2 \alpha \right] } \\[5pt]
=\ & r_b \sqrt{ 2\left[1 - \cos\left(\tfrac{2\pi}{n} - \alpha\right) \cos\alpha - \sin\left(\tfrac{2\pi}{n} - \alpha\right)\sin\alpha \right]} \\[5pt]
=\ & r_b \sqrt{ 2\left[1 - \cos\left(\tfrac{2\pi}{n} - 2\alpha\right)\right]}
\end{align}$$

while the distance $\bigl| V_{2n+1}V_{2n+2} \bigr|$ is equal to
$$\begin{align}
& r_t \sqrt{ \left[ \cos\tfrac{\pi}{n} - 1 \right]^2 + \sin^2 \tfrac{\pi}{n} } \\[5pt]
=\ & r_t \sqrt{ \left[ \cos^2\tfrac{\pi}{n} - 2\cos\tfrac{\pi}{n} + 1 \right] + \sin^2\tfrac{\pi}{n} } \\[5pt]
=\ & r_t \sqrt{2 \left[1 - \cos\tfrac{\pi}{n} \right]}
\end{align}$$

These are to be equal, and if this common edge is denoted by s,
$$\begin{align}
r_b &= \frac{s}{ \sqrt{2\left[1 - \cos\left(\tfrac{2\pi}{n} - 2\alpha \right) \right] }} \\[4pt]
r_t &= \frac{s}{ \sqrt{2\left[1 - \cos\tfrac{\pi}{n} \right] }}
\end{align}$$

These values are to be inserted into the expressions for the coordinates of the vertices given earlier.

== Star-cupolae ==
Family of star-cupolae
4	5	7	8	n/d
{4/3} Crossed square cupola (upside down)	{5/3} Crossed pentagrammic cupola (upside down)	{7/3} Heptagrammic cupola	{8/3} Octagrammic cupola	3
—	—	{7/5} Crossed heptagrammic cupola (upside down)	{8/5} Crossed octagrammic cupola	5

Family of star-cuploids
3	5	7	n/d
{3/2} Crossed triangular cuploid (upside down)	{5/2} Pentagrammic cuploid	{7/2} Heptagrammic cuploid	2
—	{5/4} Crossed pentagonal cuploid (upside down)	{7/4} Crossed heptagrammic cuploid	4

Star cupolae exist for any top base {n/d} where 6/5 < n/d < 6 and d is odd. At these limits, the cupolae collapse into plane figures. Beyond these limits, the triangles and squares can no longer span the distance between the two base polygons (it can still be made with non-equilateral isosceles triangles and non-square rectangles). If d is even, the bottom base {2n/d} becomes degenerate; then we can form a cupoloid or semicupola by withdrawing this degenerate face and letting the triangles and squares connect to each other here (through single edges) rather than to the late bottom base (through its double edges). In particular, the tetrahemihexahedron may be seen as a {3/2}-cupoloid.

The cupolae are all orientable, while the cupoloids are all non-orientable. For a cupoloid, if n/d > 2, then the triangles and squares do not cover the entire (single) base, and a small membrane is placed in this base {n/d}-gon that simply covers empty space. Hence the {5/2}- and {7/2}-cupoloids pictured above have membranes (not filled in), while the {5/4}- and {7/4}-cupoloids pictured above do not.

The height h of an {n/d}-cupola or cupoloid is given by the formula:
$$h = \sqrt{1 - \frac{1}{4 \sin^{2} \left( \frac{\pi d}{n} \right)}}.$$
In particular, h = 0 at the limits n/d = 6 and n/d = 6/5, and h is maximized at n/d = 2 (in the digonal cupola: the triangular prism, where the triangles are upright).

In the images above, the star cupolae have been given a consistent colour scheme to aid identifying their faces: the base {n/d}-gon is red, the base {2n/d}-gon is yellow, the squares are blue, and the triangles are green. The cupoloids have the base {n/d}-gon red, the squares yellow, and the triangles blue, as the base {2n/d}-gon has been withdrawn.

== Hypercupolae ==
The hypercupolae or polyhedral cupolae are a family of convex nonuniform polychora (here four-dimensional figures), analogous to the cupolas. Each one's bases are a Platonic solid and its expansion.

Name	Tetrahedral cupola		Cubic cupola		Octahedral cupola		Dodecahedral cupola		Hexagonal tiling cupola	
Schläfli symbol	{3,3} || rr{3,3}		{4,3} || rr{4,3}		{3,4} || rr{3,4}		{5,3} || rr{5,3}		{6,3} || rr{6,3}	
Segmentochora index	K4.23		K4.71		K4.107		K4.152			
circumradius	$1$		$\sqrt{\frac{3+\sqrt 2}{2}} \approx 1.485634$		$\sqrt{2+\sqrt 2} \approx 1.847759$		$3+\sqrt 5 \approx 5.236068$			
Image										
Cap cells										
Vertices	16		32		30		80		∞	
Edges	42		84		84		210		∞	
Faces	42	24 triangles 18 squares	80	32 triangles 48 squares	82	40 triangles 42 squares	194	80 triangles 90 squares 24 pentagons	∞	
Cells	16	1 tetrahedron 4 triangular prisms 6 triangular prisms 4 triangular pyramids 1 cuboctahedron	28	1 cube 6 square prisms 12 triangular prisms 8 triangular pyramids 1 rhombicuboctahedron	28	1 octahedron 8 triangular prisms 12 triangular prisms 6 square pyramids 1 rhombicuboctahedron	64	1 dodecahedron 12 pentagonal prisms 30 triangular prisms 20 triangular pyramids 1 rhombicosidodecahedron	∞	1 hexagonal tiling ∞ hexagonal prisms ∞ triangular prisms ∞ triangular pyramids 1 rhombitrihexagonal tiling
Related uniform polychora	runcinated 5-cell		runcinated tesseract		runcinated 24-cell		runcinated 120-cell		runcinated hexagonal tiling honeycomb	

== See also ==
- Orthobicupola
- Gyrobicupola
- Rotunda
