= Octahedral cupola =

Object in 4-dimensional geometry

Octahedral cupola
Schlegel diagram
Type	Polyhedral cupola	
Schläfli symbol	{3,4} v rr{3,4}	
Cells	28	1 {3,4} 1 rr{4,3} 8+12 {}×{3} 6 {}v{4}
Faces	82	40 triangles 42 squares
Edges	84	
Vertices	30	
Dual		
Symmetry group	[4,3,1], order 48	
Properties	convex, regular-faced	

In 4-dimensional geometry, the octahedral cupola is a 4-polytope bounded by one octahedron and a parallel rhombicuboctahedron, connected by 20 triangular prisms, and 6 square pyramids.

== Related polytopes ==
The octahedral cupola can be sliced off from a runcinated 24-cell, on a hyperplane parallel to an octahedral cell. The cupola can be seen in a B_{2} and B_{3} Coxeter plane orthogonal projection of the runcinated 24-cell:

Runcinated 24-cell	Octahedron (cupola top)	Rhombicuboctahedron (cupola base)
B_{3} Coxeter plane
B_{2} Coxeter plane

== See also ==
- Octahedral pyramid
- Cubic cupola
- Runcinated 24-cell
