= Frustum =

Portion of a solid that lies between two parallel planes cutting the solid

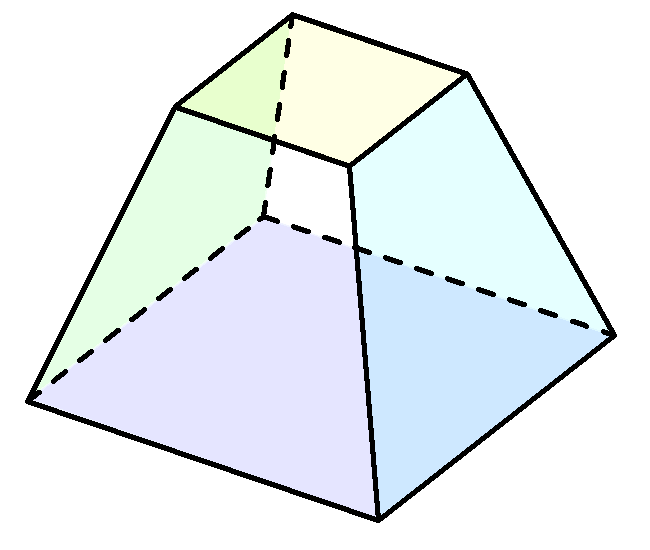
Pentagonal frustum and square frustum

In geometry, a frustum (pl. frusta or frustums), is the portion of a solid (normally a pyramid or a cone) that lies between two parallel planes cutting the solid. In the case of a pyramid, the base faces are polygonal and the side faces are trapezoidal. A right frustum is a right pyramid or a right cone truncated perpendicularly to its axis; otherwise, it is an oblique frustum.

Example of truncated pentagonal oblique pyramid (oblique frustum) - with truncation plane not parallel to base. In this image, the original pentagonal pyramid is also an oblique pyramid where the axis is not perpendicular to the base.

In a truncated cone or truncated pyramid, the truncation plane is not necessarily parallel to the cone's base, as in a frustum.

If all its edges are the same length, then a frustum becomes a prism (possibly oblique or/and with irregular bases).

== Elements, special cases, and related concepts ==
A frustum's axis is that of the original cone or pyramid. A frustum is circular if it has circular bases; it is right if the axis is perpendicular to both bases, and oblique otherwise.

The height of a frustum is the perpendicular distance between the planes of the two bases.

Cones and pyramids can be viewed as degenerate cases of frusta, where one of the cutting planes passes through the apex (so that the corresponding base reduces to a point). The pyramidal frusta are a subclass of prismatoids.

Two frusta with two congruent bases joined at these congruent bases make a bifrustum.

== Formulas ==
=== Volume ===
Pyramidal frustum

The formula for the volume of a pyramidal square frustum was introduced by the ancient Egyptian mathematics in what is called the Moscow Mathematical Papyrus, written in the 13th dynasty (c. 1850 BC):

$$V = \frac{h}{3}\left(a^2 + ab + b^2\right),$$

where a and b are the base and top side lengths, and h is the height.

The Egyptians knew the correct formula for the volume of such a truncated square pyramid, but no proof of this equation is given in the Moscow papyrus.

The volume of a conical or pyramidal frustum is the volume of the solid before slicing its "apex" off, minus the volume of this "apex":

$$V = \frac{h_1 B_1 - h_2 B_2}{3},$$

where B_{1} and B_{2} are the base and top areas, and h_{1} and h_{2} are the perpendicular heights from the apex to the base and top planes.

Considering that

$$\frac{B_1}{h_1^2} = \frac{B_2}{h_2^2} = \frac{\sqrt{B_1B_2}}{h_1h_2} = \alpha,$$

the formula for the volume can be expressed as the third of the product of this proportionality, $\alpha$, and of the difference of the cubes of the heights h_{1} and h_{2} only:

$$V = \frac{h_1 \alpha h_1^2 - h_2 \alpha h_2^2}{3} = \alpha\frac{h_1^3 - h_2^3}{3}.$$

By using the identity a^{3} − b^{3} = (a − b)(a^{2} + ab + b^{2}), one gets:

$$V = (h_1 - h_2)\alpha\frac{h_1^2 + h_1h_2 + h_2^2}{3},$$

where h_{1} − h_{2} = h is the height of the frustum.

Distributing $\alpha$ and substituting from its definition, the Heronian mean of areas B_{1} and B_{2} is obtained:

$$\frac{B_1 + \sqrt{B_1B_2} + B_2}{3};$$

the alternative formula is therefore:

$$V = \frac{h}{3}\left(B_1 + \sqrt{B_1B_2} + B_2\right).$$

Heron of Alexandria is noted for deriving this formula, and with it, encountering the imaginary unit: the square root of negative one.

3D model of a conical frustum

In particular:

- The volume of a circular cone frustum is:

$$V = \frac{\pi h}{3}\left(r_1^2 + r_1r_2 + r_2^2\right),$$

where r_{1} and r_{2} are the base and top radii.

- The volume of a pyramidal frustum whose bases are regular n-gons is:

$$V = \frac{nh}{12}\left(a_1^2 + a_1a_2 + a_2^2\right)\cot\frac{\pi}{n},$$

where a_{1} and a_{2} are the base and top side lengths.

=== Surface area ===
Conical frustum

For a right circular conical frustum the slant height $s$ is

$\displaystyle s=\sqrt{\left(r_1-r_2\right)^2+h^2},$

the lateral surface area is

$\displaystyle \pi\left(r_1+r_2\right)s,$

and the total surface area is

$\displaystyle \pi\left(\left(r_1+r_2\right)s+r_1^2+r_2^2\right),$

where r_{1} and r_{2} are the base and top radii respectively.

== Examples ==
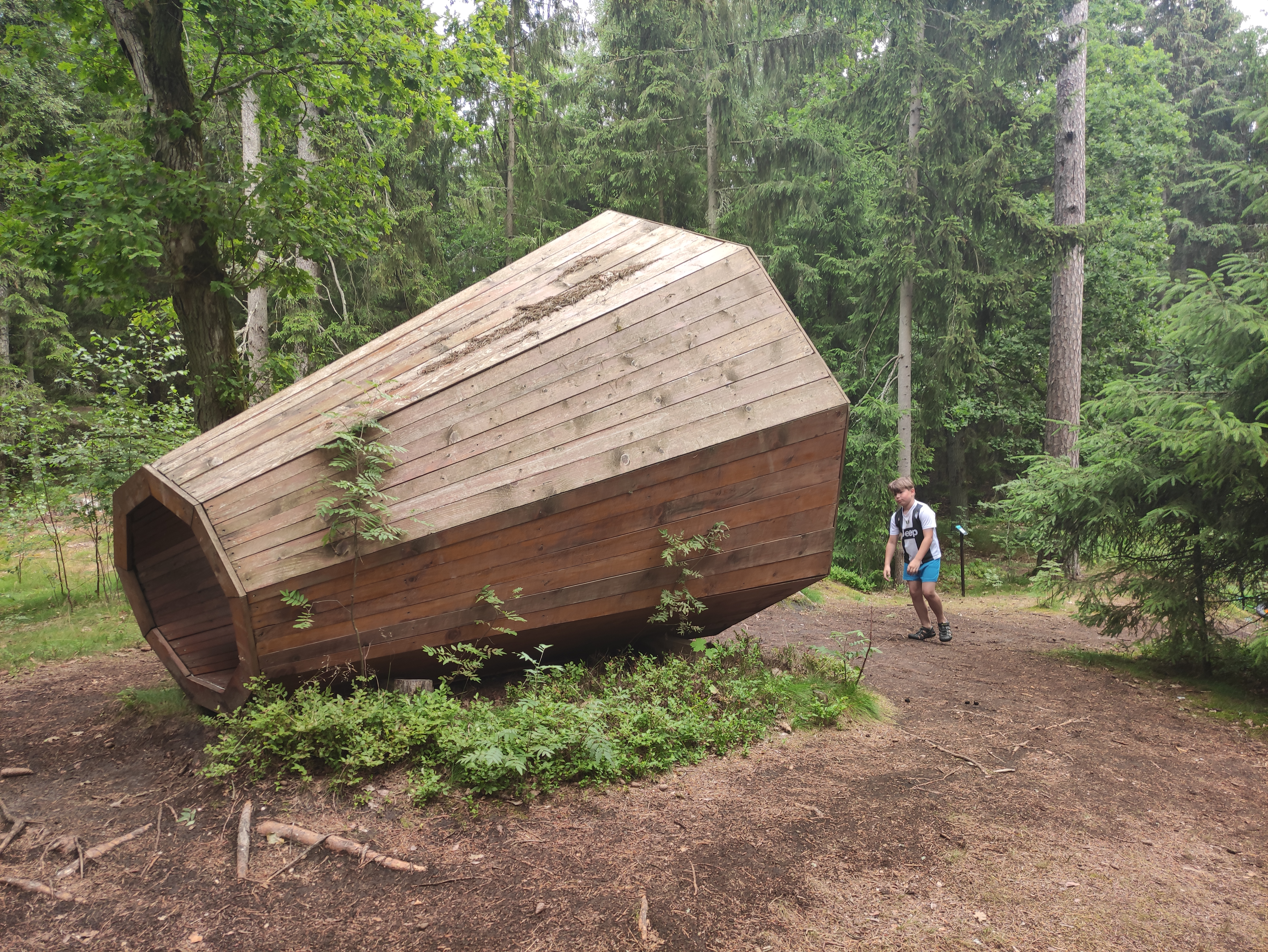
- Sound Catcher, Neringa, Lithuania
  On the back (the reverse) of a United States one-dollar bill, a pyramidal frustum appears on the reverse of the Great Seal of the United States, surmounted by the Eye of Providence.
- Ziggurats, step pyramids, and certain ancient Native American mounds also form the frustum of one or more pyramids, with additional features such as stairs added.
- Chinese pyramids.
- The John Hancock Center in Chicago, Illinois, is a frustum whose bases are rectangles.
- The Washington Monument is a narrow square-based pyramidal frustum topped by a small pyramid.
- The viewing frustum in 3D computer graphics is a virtual photographic or video camera's usable field of view modeled as a pyramidal frustum.
- In the English translation of Stanislaw Lem's short-story collection The Cyberiad, the poem Love and tensor algebra claims that "every frustum longs to be a cone".
- Buckets and typical lampshades are everyday examples of conical frustums.
- Drinking glasses and some space capsules are also some examples.
- Sound Catcher: a wooden sculpture in Lithuania.
- Valençay cheese
- Rolo candies
- Crème caramel, or flan

== See also ==
- Spherical frustum
- Trapezohedron
- Diminished trapezohedron
